= Akwesasne 15 =

Akwesasne 15 Kaná:takon and Tsi Snaíhne
- Indian reserve
- Location within Southern Quebec
- Coordinates: 45°06′N 74°58′W
- Country: Canada
- Province: Quebec
- Region: Montérégie
- First Nation: Akwesasne
- Time zone: UTC-5 (EST)
  - Summer (DST): UTC-4 (EDT)
- Website: www.akwesasne.ca

Akwesasne 15 (Mohawk: Kaná:takon and Tsi Snaíhne) is an Indian reserve in Quebec. It is part of the larger Mohawk community of Akwesasne (St Regis), a trans-border community which includes Akwesasne 59 in Ontario and St. Regis Reservation in New York. As the Mohawk of Akwesasne are independent of the federal and provincial governments, this division is largely for statistical purposes.

The reserve includes the settlements of Kaná:takon (St. Regis) and Tsi Snaihne (Snye), as well as Yellow Island, St. Regis Island, and Sugarbush Island in the Saint Lawrence River.

== Education ==
Ahkwesahsne Mohawk Board of Education (AMBE) operates Kana:takon School and Tsi Snaihne School (preschool through middle school) within the reserve.

AMBE agrees to pay tuition for high school students to two school districts in Ontario: Upper Canada District School Board (UCDSB), with AMBE-tuition-paid students going to Cornwall Collegiate and Vocational School and some other UCSDB programs, and Catholic District School Board of Eastern Ontario (CDSBEO), with AMBE-tuition-paid students going to St Joseph's Secondary School and some other CDSBEO programs.
