= Mary Leaf =

Akwesasronon basket maker

- Born: 1925
- Died: 2004 (aged 78–79)
- Known for: Basketry

Mary Leaf (1925–2004) was an Akwesasronon basket maker, who lived on the border between Canada and the United States. Leaf specialized in basket making, having learned customary basketry techniques from her mother. Her work can be found in the collections of the Newark Museum and the National Museum of the American Indian.

== Biography ==
Leaf was born in 1925 on the St. Regis Mohawk Reservation that lies on the border between Canada and the United States. Her mother, Josephine Thompson, taught her brown ash basketry weaving and lacrosse stick lacing techniques at a young age. Leaf created baskets that were often primarily aesthetic, including small colourful "fancy" baskets in the shape of strawberries. Other women known for this curl and twist technique of basket making are Florence Benedict, Mary Adams, and Katie Sickles. Although utilitarian basket-making became less common after the 1930s—as the Great Depression ended and Mohawk people began finding more non-agricultural jobs—Leaf became known as a Mohawk basket maker and influenced the resurgence of basket-making in the Northeastern Woodlands in the late 20th century.

== Art career ==
Leaf's baskets can be found in collections at the Newark Museum of New Jersey, the North American Indian Traveling College of Ontario, the Iroquois Indian Museum in Howes Cave, NY, and the National Museum of the American Indian. In 2015, the Thunder Bay Art Gallery featured her baskets in an exhibition, Woven from Wood.

== Honours ==
In 1983, Leaf was honoured at a special banquet for Akwesasne basket makers hosted in Hogansburg, New York.

== Death ==
Leaf died in 2004.
