= Akwesasne 59 =

Akwesasne 59 Kawehnò:ke Iroquois of St Regis Indian Reserve No. 59
- Indian reserve
- Location within Southern Ontario
- Coordinates: 45°02′N 74°34′W
- Country: Canada
- Province: Ontario
- County: Stormont, Dundas and Glengarry
- indian: Akwesasne

Area
  - Land: 11.86 km^{2} (4.58 sq mi)

Population (2011)
  - Total: incompletely enumerated
- Time zone: UTC-5 (EST)
  - Summer (DST): UTC-4 (EDT)
- Website: www.akwesasne.ca

Akwesasne 59 (Mohawk: Kawehnò:ke), also known as Iroquois of St Regis Indian Reserve 59, is an Indian reserve in Ontario. It is part of the larger Mohawk community of Akwesasne, which includes Akwesasne 15 in Quebec and St. Regis Reservation in New York. As the Mohawk of Akwesasne are independent of the federal and provincial governments, this division is largely for statistical purposes.

The reserve includes Cornwall Island.

== Education ==
Ahkwesahsne Mohawk Board of Education (AMBE) operates Ahkwesahsne Mohawk School (preschool through middle school) on Cornwall Island.

AMBE agrees to pay tuition for high school students to two school districts in Ontario: Upper Canada District School Board (UCDSB), with AMBE-tuition-paid students going to Cornwall Collegiate and Vocational School and some other UCSDB programs, and Catholic District School Board of Eastern Ontario (CDSBEO), with AMBE-tuition-paid students going to St Joseph's Secondary School and some other CDSBEO programs.

UCDSB categorizes Cornwall Island to be in the district's Ward 11.
