= AFS =

AFS may refer to:

== Education ==
- Abington Friends School, in Jenkintown, Pennsylvania, US
- AFS Intercultural Programs, formerly American Field Service
- Akwesasne Freedom School, in New York, US (Awkewsasne)

== Organizations ==
- AFS Trinity, a US company
- Alternative for Sweden, a political party in Sweden
- American Folklore Society
- American Foundry Society
- Arbeitsstelle für Standardisierung (AfS), a workgroup of the German National Library (DNB)
- Army Fire Service, UK
- Association of Football Statisticians, UK
- Australian Flag Society
- Auxiliary Fire Service, UK and Ireland

== Places ==
- Afs, Idlib, a Syrian village
- Ashford railway station (Surrey) (station code:AFS), Middlesex, UK
- South Africa, ITU country code
- Zarafshan Airport in Navoiy Region, Uzbekistan (IATA airport code AFS)

== Science and technology ==
=== Computing ===
- Andrew File System, a distributed networked file system
  - OpenAFS, an open source implementation of the Andrew File System
- Apple File Service, implementing the Apple Filing Protocol
- Apple File System, Apple's proprietary file system
- AtheOS File System, part of the Syllable operating system

=== Other uses in science and technology ===
- Advanced front-lighting system (AFS) or Adaptative Front-lighting System, for automotive headlamps
- Aeronautical fixed service, for air navigation
- Allergic fungal sinusitis
- Atomic fluorescence spectroscopy
- Nikon AF-S, a type of Nikon F-mount lens

== Other uses ==
- Afghan afghani, unit of currency
- Afro-Seminole Creole language (ISO 639-3: oafs)
- "AFS", a song by Natanael Cano from Nata Montana, 2023
- Air force station
- Alternative financial service
- American Foursquare, a style of house
- Available for sale, an accounting term
- International Convention on the Control of Harmful Anti-fouling Systems on Ships, 2001
- Combat Stores Ship (AFS), by US Navy hull classification symbol
