= Akwesasne =

Mohawk territory in New York and Canada

Akwesasne Ahkwesáhsne (Mohawk)
- Mohawk Territory
- Mohawk Nation at Akwesasne
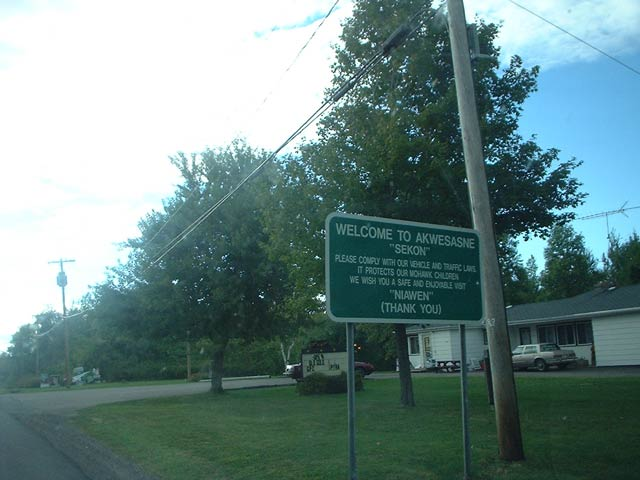
- Road sign in Akwesasne

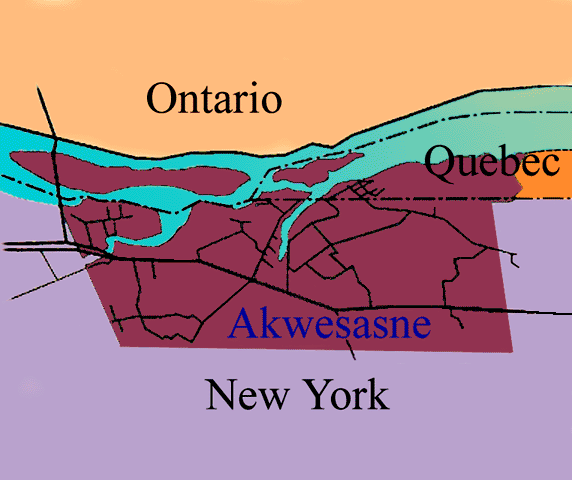
- Map of the Mohawk Nation at Akwesasne

- Location within New York Akwesasne (Ontario) Akwesasne (Quebec) Akwesasne (the United States) Akwesasne (Canada)
- Coordinates: 44°58′16″N 74°38′31″W
- Permanently Settled: 1754

Government
  - Language: English (de facto); Mohawk (official)

Area
  - Land: 85.89 km^{2} (33.16 sq mi)

Population
  - Total: 14,000
  - Density: 160/km^{2} (420/sq mi)
- Demonym: Akwesasro꞉non
- Time zone: UTC−5 (Eastern (EST))
  - Summer (DST): UTC−4 (EDT)
- Postal code span/ZIP Code: H0M 1A0, H0M 0A1 (Akwesasne); K6H 5R7 (Cornwall); 13655 (Hogansburg); 13683 (Rooseveltown); 12914 (Bombay); 13649 (Helena); 13613 (Brasher Falls)
- Area codes: 518, 613, 343
- Website: www.akwesasne.ca https://www.srmt-nsn.gov

The Mohawk Nation at Akwesasne (/ˌækwəˈsæsneɪ/ AK-wə-SAS-neh; French: Nation Mohawk à Akwesasne; Mohawk: Ahkwesáhsne) is a Mohawk (Kanienʼkehá:ka) territory that straddles the intersection of international (United States and Canada) borders and provincial (Ontario and Quebec) boundaries on both banks of the St. Lawrence River. Although divided by an international border, the residents consider themselves to be one community. They maintain separate police forces due to jurisdictional issues and national laws.

The community was founded in the mid-18th century by Mohawk families from Kahnawake (also known as Caughnawaga), a Catholic Mohawk village that developed south of Montreal along the St. Lawrence River. Today Akwesasne has a total of 12,000 residents, with the largest population and land area of any Kanienʼkehá:ka community. From its development in the mid-eighteenth century, Akwesasne was considered one of the Seven Nations of Canada. It is one of several Kanienʼkehá:ka (Mohawk) territories within present-day Canada; others are Kahnawake, Wahta, Tyendinaga, Kanesatake, and the Six Nations of the Grand River First Nation (which includes several subdivisions of Mohawk, the other five nations of the Haudenosaunee Confederacy, and some other Native American tribes), founded after the American Revolutionary War.

With settlement of the border between Canada and the United States in the early 19th century, a larger portion of the territory was defined as being within the United States. The portion in New York state is known as the federally recognized St. Regis Mohawk Reservation. The portion in Ontario is referred to as Akwesasne Reserve No. 59 (Mohawk: Kawehnò:ke), and the portions in Quebec as Akwesasne Reserve No. 15 (Mohawk: Kaná:takon & Tsi Snaíhne).

In Mohawk, the name Ahkwesáhsne means "Land Where the Partridge Drums", referring to the rich wildlife in the area.

== History ==
Beginning about 1000 AD, nomadic Indigenous people around the Great Lakes began adopting the cultivation of maize. By the 14th century, Iroquoian-speaking peoples, later called the St. Lawrence Iroquoians, had created fortified villages along the fertile valley of what is now called the St. Lawrence River. Among their villages were Stadacona and Hochelaga, visited in 1535–1536 by French explorer Jacques Cartier. While they shared certain culture with other Iroquoian groups, they were a distinctly separate people and spoke a branch of Iroquoian called Laurentian. But by the time Samuel de Champlain explored the same area 75 years later in the early 1600s, the villages had disappeared.

Historians theorize that the stronger Mohawk from the South waged war against the St. Lawrence Iroquoians to get control of the fur trade and hunting along the river valley. By 1600, the Mohawk used the valley for hunting grounds and as a path for war parties.

In the early 17th century, some Christian Haudenosaunee (primarily Mohawk, but also some Oneida, Onondaga, Cayuga and Seneca) migrated from present-day New York to Kahnawake (formerly known as Caughnawaga, after their village along the Mohawk River), a Catholic mission village established by French Jesuits south of Montreal. Kahnawake is a Kanienʼkehá:ka (Mohawk) word meaning "at the rapids". Here, additional First Nations joined the community, converting to Roman Catholicism; the Mohawk dominated in number. During the colonial years, this community participated in the fur trade. Some men regularly traveled to Albany, New York for better prices from the English and Dutch than the French were willing to give.

In addition, warriors and families became involved in raiding and the traffic in captives during Queen Anne's War in the early 1700s between France and England. French and First Nations allies, including the Abenaki, would bring captives back to Kahnawake from New England settlements, often to be ransomed. Younger English children and women were sometimes adopted by Mohawk families and assimilated into the tribe.

Due to exhaustion of land at Kahnawake and problems with traders' rum at the village, in the mid-1750s about 30 families migrated upriver about 20 leagues to set up a new community. Among the leaders were brothers and chiefs John and Zachariah Tarbell. Father Pierre-Robert-Jean-Baptiste Billiard accompanied the migrants as their priest. French officials supported the move, paying for a sawmill at the new mission. With tensions rising prior to the Seven Years' War (also known in North America as the French and Indian War), the French wanted to keep the Mohawk as allies, and away from English influence.

The Tarbell brothers were born to English colonists in Groton, Massachusetts. They had been taken captive as children in 1707 along with their older sister Sarah, then 14, during Queen Anne's War. John and Zachariah were 12 and 8, respectively. The three children were taken by the French and Abenaki raiders some 300 miles to Montreal. They all became Catholic and were renamed. Sarah/Marguerite was redeemed by a French couple and entered the Congregation of Notre Dame, a teaching order founded in Montreal by French women in 1653. Adopted by Mohawk families in Kahnawake, the two boys became thoroughly assimilated: learning the language and ways, and being given Mohawk names. They later each married daughters of chiefs and reared their children as Mohawk. They each became chiefs, and some of their sons also became chiefs. They were examples of the multi-cultural community of the Mohawk, who absorbed numerous captives into their tribe.

Starting in 1755, French-Canadian Jesuit priests founded the St. Regis Mission at Akwesasne. The Tarbell brothers were listed among the founding chiefs, representing numerous clans as of 1759, in papers of Loran Kanonsase Pyke, the patriarch of Akwesasne's Pyke family.

The Jesuits first built a log and bark church at the mission, then a more formal log church. In 1795 the Mohawk completed construction of a stone church, which still stands. Named after the French priest St. Jean-François Regis, the mission was the source of the French name of the adjacent Saint Regis River, an island in the St. Lawrence River, and the nearby village. The church was long a landmark to ships on the river approaching the rapids. In New York, the name was later adopted to apply to the Saint Regis Mohawk Reservation. The villagers have since renamed their community Kana:takon ("the village", in Mohawk).

After victory in the Seven Years' War, the British took over Canada and New France east of the Mississippi River. They allowed the Kanienʼkehá꞉ka to continue to have Catholic priests at their mission. The Jesuits helped preserve Mohawk culture, translating the Bible and liturgy into Mohawk. They observed Mohawk customs, for instance, refusing to marry individuals who belonged to the same clan, as this was prohibited by kinship practices. Through the 18th and 19th centuries, they maintained parish registers that recorded the Mohawk names of individuals for life events, even when the people had taken European names as well.

At the time of the American Revolutionary War, the Mohawk, Onondaga, Seneca and Cayuga were allied with the British against the rebel American colonists. Forced to cede most of their remaining lands in New York to the new government after the colonists' victory, many of the Haudenosaunee migrated to Canada, where many settled at the Six Nations of the Grand River First Nation.

Some Mohawk joined the growing community at Akwesasne. Under the Jay Treaty, the Haudenosaunee retained rights to cross the newly established borders between Canada and the United States in order to maintain their trade and tribal ties. In 1806, Catholic Cayuga, Oneida and Onondaga from Ogdensburg, New York, joined the St. Regis band.

=== Battle of the Cedars ===
The Battle of the Cedars (French: Les Cèdres) was a series of military confrontations, early in the American Revolutionary War, which involved limited combat. The actions took place between May 19–27, 1776, at and around Les Cèdres, Quebec (located 28 mi (45 km) west of Montreal), in the later stages of the American colonial invasion of Quebec that began in September 1775. No casualties occurred.

Claude de Lorimier, a British Indian agent from Montreal, traveled west to Oswegatchie (Ogdensburg, New York), where there was a fort garrisoned by a company of the 8th Regiment of Foot under the command of British Captain George Forster. De Lorimier proposed recruiting some Indians to launch an attack from the west on Montreal, then held by the American Continental Army. When Forster agreed, Lorimier went to Akwesasne, where he recruited 100 warriors for battle. The British-allied forces took some American prisoners during the encounters, but these were later freed.

=== Dundee land claim ===
In the early 1800s, non-Indigenous settlers leased a part of the Akwesasne reserve located in mainland Quebec, known as Dundee. In 1888, the superintendent of Indian Affairs requested that the band surrender this land. They surrendered the land, but the First Nation always contested the validity of the action by the government, as they had not intended to surrender it.

In the 20th century, the First Nation of Akwesasne filed a claim with the government for compensation for that land surrender. It was a period in which the nations were working to correct earlier wrongs and to assert their sovereignty over their treaty territories. In December 2018, Akwesasne accepted a specific claim settlement of $240M for the Dundee parcel, 37 years after they had first filed their claim with the government of Canada.

=== 20th-century institutions ===
By the 20th century, Akwesasne had renewed ties with the Haudenosaunee Confederacy and been readopted into the Six Nations.

Kana:takon School, originally called the Saint Regis Village School, was run by the Catholic Sisters of Saint Anne until the 1970s. Today, the mission is still active and includes a rectory, the large stone church dating to 1795, and a cemetery. Parish records show that the Jesuits respected Mohawk traditions, recording their Mohawk names through the 18th and 19th centuries, even after they had also taken European names.

The Roman Catholic parish at Akwesasne falls under three dioceses because of international borders and provincial boundaries: the Diocese of Alexandria-Cornwall and the Diocese of Valleyfield in Canada, and the Diocese of Ogdensburg in New York.

Following passage of the Indian Reorganization Act of 1934, the United States federal government encouraged the tribe to adopt a constitution and elected government. The Mohawk chose to retain their traditional system of hereditary chiefs.

In the 1940s, Ernest Benedict founded Akwesasne's first newspaper, Kawehras! ("It Thunders!"). Benedict covered the resistance of many Mohawk to the system of elections imposed by the federal government on the "American" side of Akwesasne. The US had insisted on representative elections. On May 24, 1948, a vote was held in which "The Six Nations Chiefs", based on historic clans and hereditary office, received 83 votes. "The Elected Chiefs" received only one vote, and "The Seven Nations Chiefs" did not receive any votes. The elected chiefs resigned from office, but the federal government continued to require the tribe to hold elections.

Both the federal government and New York State encouraged the tribe to adopt representative elected government, but they resisted. In the 1950s, the Mohawk of St. Regis were among federally recognized tribes to be added to a congressional list for termination of tribal status in relation to the federal government. It was part of a US policy to lift special treatment of certain Indian nations as part of a policy of assimilation. But Congress did not approve the termination of the St. Regis Reservation.

In 1969, Benedict founded the North American Indian Travelling College (now known as the Native North American Travelling College), which serves as a cultural centre, publishing house, and resource for classes and lectures at Akwesasne and beyond. It operates an art gallery and theatre at Akwesasne.

In the late 1960s, a period of heightened Native American activism, Benedict also started Akwesasne Notes. The newspaper became highly influential and the largest native newspaper in the world. Among its noted features were a series of posters included as centrefolds. A supporter gave the newspaper Edward Curtis photographs, which editors combined with quotes from Native American authors for the popular poster series.

In 1987, the Akwesasne Task Force on the Environment was founded in response to environmental concerns, including extensive contamination by PCB (Polychlorinated biphenyl) as a byproduct of industries located along the St. Lawrence River.

In the 1990s, the people of Akwesasne raised money in a variety of ways to fund a renovation of their 200-year-old St. Regis Church. They wrote a history of the church and its priests.

== Geography ==
Akwesasne territory incorporates part of the St. Lawrence River, the mouths of the Raquette and St. Regis rivers, and a number of islands in these three rivers. The eastern border of the southern portion is formed by the St. Regis River. The territory is divided north–south by the Canada–United States border. The northern portion is further divided by the Canadian provincial boundary between Ontario to the west and Quebec to the east.

The Three Nations Crossing connects Kawehno:ke (Cornwall Island, Ontario) to the City of Cornwall in the north and Rooseveltown, New York in the south.

Because of the St. Lawrence River to the north, New York State, United States, to the south, and the absence of a road link to the rest of Quebec, to the east, the Quebec portion of the Akwesasne reserve is a practical exclave claimed by Canada. To travel by land from Tsi Snaihne (Snye or Chenail, Quebec) or Kana:takon (Saint Regis, Quebec) to elsewhere in Canada, one must drive through New York State. In Canada, the territory within Ontario is called the Akwesasne 59 Indian Reserve, and the territory within Quebec is called the Akwesasne 15 Indian Reserve.

In the U.S. state of New York, the territory of Akwesasne coincides with what is called the federally recognized St. Regis Mohawk Reservation. This portion of Akwesasne is bisected by New York State Route 37. This major state highway in the North Country of New York, extends for 127.4 mi (205.0 km) on an east–west axis.

=== Communities, hamlets and villages ===
The three main areas:

- Kawehno:ke (Cornwall Island, Ontario)
- Kana:takon (Saint Regis, Quebec)
- Tsi Snaihne (Snye, Quebec or Chenail, Quebec)

Others:

- Raquette Point, New York
- Rooseveltown, New York (disputed)
- Hogansburg, New York
- Frogtown, New York
- Pilon Island, Ontario
- Yellow Island, Quebec
- St. Regis Island, Quebec
- Sugarbush Island, Quebec
- Outlying islands

=== Surrounding communities ===
Akwesasne borders the towns of Brasher, New York, Fort Covington, New York and Bombay, New York. Sections of the southeastern portion of Akwesasne are considered by the Town of Bombay to be within the town's jurisdiction but the tribe disputes this. To the west is the Town of Massena, New York. Many islands in the St. Lawrence River are part of Akwesasne. Generally the Akwesasro:non are majority English-speaking in daily use.

On the Canadian parts of the territory, Akwesasne borders the towns of Cornwall, Ontario, and Dundee, Quebec.

== Government ==
Akwesasne is governed by three bodies: the Mohawk Nation Council of Chiefs (traditional government), the elected Mohawk Council of Akwesasne in the North, and Saint Regis Mohawk Tribe in the South. The latter are the two recognized by the governments of Canada and the United States, respectively, as well as by lower-level jurisdictions such as provinces and states.

=== Mohawk Nation Council of Chiefs ===
The Mohawk Nation Council of Chiefs (MNCC, colloquially "the Longhouse") is the "traditional" governing and religious body of the Mohawk (Kahnien'kehà:ka) people. The MNCC operates as a member nation of the Haudenosaunee Confederacy.

=== Mohawk Council of Akwesasne ===
The Mohawk Council of Akwesasne (MCA) is a government whose representatives are elected within the northern districts of the territory on the Canadian side of the border. The MCA was developed from the Indian Bands system introduced by the Indian Act of Canada and the Act's historical and legal predecessors. They are known to Canada as Mohawks of Akwesasne Bands 59 and 15.

The MCA operates as a non-partisan, representative democracy, divided into three geographic and administrative districts. The districts are Kana:takon (Saint Regis, Quebec), Kawehno:ke (Cornwall Island, Ontario) and Tsi Snaihne (Snye, Quebec). The several islands of the St. Lawrence River within the jurisdiction of the Mohawk Council of Akwesasne are generally counted as being a part of the nearest mainland.

General elections are held triennially, with 12 representatives (Chiefs) chosen from the districts and one Grand Chief. Each district elects four Chiefs, and all districts vote at-large to elect a Grand Chief. Thus the council is 12 plus 1. A by-election may also be held if one or more of the seats become vacant.

==== Chiefs of the Mohawk Council of Akwesasne ====
Grand Chief

- Leonard Lazore

Kana:takon District Chiefs:

- Cody David
- Fallon David
- Theresa Jacobs
- Teresa Oakes

Tsi Snaihne District Chiefs

- Scott Peters
- Tesha Rourke
- JoAnn Swamp
- Sarah Sunday-Diabo

Kawehno:ke District Chiefs:

- Lisa Francis-Benedict
- Lacey Pierce
- Tom Thomas
- Vince Thompson

=== Saint Regis Mohawk Tribe ===
The Saint Regis Mohawk Tribe (SRMT) is a government elected by Mohawk Tribal citizens of the St. Regis Mohawk Reservation, a southern district of the territory within the border of the United States. The SRMT operates as a Constitutional republic. The Tribal Council is composed of three Chiefs, three Sub-Chiefs, and a Tribal Clerk. Elections are held each year on the first Saturday of June to choose one Chief and one Sub-Chief for a three-year term. The Tribal Clerk is chosen every third year.

==== Council of the Saint Regis Mohawk Tribe ====
- Chief Donald Thompson Jr.
- Chief Ross Garrow
- Chief Michael L. Conners
- Sub-Chief Benjamin J. Herne
- Sub-Chief Agnes 'Sweets' Jacobs
- Sub-Chief Derrick King
- Tribal Clerk Summer Bero
- Chief Judge Kristie Walsdorf
- Traffic Court Judge #1 Lois Terrance
- Traffic Court Judge #2 Victor Martin
- Chief Legal Counsel Dale White

=== Governance: Canada and the United States ===
In 1960, First Nations people were enfranchised in Canada. In 1985, Status Indians who voted in a Canadian election were allowed to retain their status. Previously they would have become non-Status, as per the Indian Act. It is uncertain how many Akwesasro꞉non participate in Canadian elections.

Akwesasne is currently represented in Canada's Parliament by:

- Claude DeBellefeuille, Bloc Quebecois MP (Salaberry—Suroît, Quebec)
- Eric Duncan, Conservative Party MP (Stormont-Dundas-South Glengarry, Ontario)

Akwesasne is represented in the:

- Legislative Assembly of Ontario by Nolan Quinn, Progressive Conservative MPP (Stormont-Dundas-South Glengarry, Ontario)
- National Assembly of Quebec by Carole Mallette, Coalition Avenir Québec MNA (Huntingdon, Quebec)

In 1924, Native Americans were enfranchised in the United States if they had not been previously; by that time, two-thirds were already citizens. During the era of Indian Removal of the 1830s, Native Americans who chose to stay in historic territories became state and federal citizens; those who moved with their tribes to Indian Territory were not considered citizens. As Native American lands were purchased during the nineteenth century and Native land claims were extinguished, more were classified as US citizens as they moved to reservations.

Akwesasne is represented in the United States Senate by:

- United States Senator Charles Schumer (D- NY)
- United States Senator Kirsten Gillibrand (D- NY)

Akwesasne is represented in the:

- United States House of Representatives by Representative Elise Stefanik (R-21st, NY)
- New York State Assembly by Representative Billy Jones
- New York Senate by Senator Dan Stec

=== Legal system ===
In 2016, Akwesasne established an independent Indigenous legal system and court to deal with non-criminal offenses within the reserve. The 32 new laws cover civil matters handled by an Indigenous legal team director of public prosecution, public prosecutor, and two justices.

The system does not rely on jail terms but uses restorative justice to bring resolution between the accused and plaintiff. The members of the legal team are not required to have a law degree but are required to complete training and are approved by a review commission.

== Education ==
Akwesasne has five elementary schools on the territory. Generally, Akwesasnro:non travel off the reservation for secondary education.

Post-secondary education is offered on the reservation through Iohahi:io Akwesasne Education & Training Institute and State University of New York (SUNY) extension programs with the SRMT.

=== Education in Canada ===
Three schools, in Canada, are under the direction of the Ahkwesahsne Mohawk Board of Education (AMBE):

- Ahkwesahsne Mohawk School – K–4, K–5, grades 1–8 (Cornwall Island, Ontario)
- Kana:takon School – K–4, K–5, grades 1–5 (Akwesasne, Quebec)
- Tsi Snaihne School – K–4, K–5, grades 1–8 (Quebec)

Prior to 1987, the Department of Indian and Northern Affairs Canada controlled K–12 education on the Canadian side. The Ahkwesahsne Mohawk Board of Education, established by the MCA two years prior, gained operations of those schools from the department in 1987.

AMBE agrees to pay tuition for high school students to two school districts in Ontario: Upper Canada District School Board (UCDSB), with AMBE-tuition-paid students going to Cornwall Collegiate and Vocational School and some other UCSDB programs, and Catholic District School Board of Eastern Ontario (CDSBEO), with AMBE-tuition-paid students going to St Joseph's Secondary School and some other CDSBEO programs. UCDSB categorizes Cornwall Island to be in the district's Ward 11.

As of 1985 schools located in Canada take Akwesasne children living in the United States.

=== Education in the United States ===
One school is under the direction of the Salmon River Central School District of New York, which covers the whole St. Regis Mohawk Reservation, and a portion of the census-designated place (in New York State, United States):.

- St. Regis Mohawk School – Pre-K to grade 6 – It is located on the reservation property. The State of New York owns the building and provides repairs, while the school district staffs the school and provides operational services.

The zoned secondary schools of the Salmon River district are Salmon River Middle School and Salmon River High School. Other portions of the CDP are within the Brasher Falls Central School District and the Massena Central School District.

There are Head Start programs in the United States part of Akwesasne. As of 1985 some children living in the Canadian side use these programs.

=== Private schools ===
There is one private school:

- Akwesasne Freedom School (in New York) - Pre-K to grade 8, featuring Kanienʼkehá immersion to strengthen language and culture on the reserve. With children learning Kanienʼkehá, many parents and other adults are now taking language classes, too. The Akwesasne model of language and cultural revival is being followed by other communities.

== Media ==
=== Radio ===
97.3 CKON-FM is the community radio station. It first went on air on September 29, 1984. CKON is owned and operated by the Akwesasne Communication Society, a community-based non-profit group. It has a country music format, and also has adult contemporary music during evenings, a free format on Fridays, and oldies on Sundays. CKON also broadcasts coverage of home and away games of the Cornwall Colts and Akwesasne Wolves hockey teams, and of the Akwesasne Lightning lacrosse team.

WICY, a radio station in Malone, New York, has an FM transmitter in Akwesasne, 103.5 W278CS.

87.9 FM Karennaon:we transmits at 87.9 MHz on the FM dial. Karennaon:we went on the air on December 21, 2017. It is owned and operated by Equal Skies Media and broadcasts the music and language of the Haudenosaunee confederacy and other first nations. Karennaon:we Radio is a positive resource for the children of the Mohawk community making available the language and culture 24 hours a day. Karennaon:we Radio is not for profit and receives no funding from federal, provincial, or tribal governments.

=== Online and print media ===
- Akwesasne Notes
- Indian Time
- Akwesasne TV

== Attractions ==
- Akwesasne Annual International Pow-wow
- Akwesasne Cultural Center
- Akwesasne Mohawk Casino
- Annual Akwesasne Winter Carnival
- Iohahi:io Akwesasne Education & Training Institute
- Mohawk International Raceway - formerly known as Frogtown International Speedway; a dirt track racing oval and host of outdoor concerts
- Ronathahon:ni Cultural Centre - formerly known as the Native North American Traveling College
- Strawberry Music Festival

== Political activism ==
=== 1969 border crossing dispute ===
In the winter of 1969, Cornwall City Police were confronted by a demonstration by Akwesasro:non at the North Channel Bridge of what is now called the Three Nations Crossing. By blocking traffic on the bridge, Akwesasro:non sought to call attention to their grievance that they were prohibited by Canadian authorities from duty-free passage of personal purchases across the border. They claimed this right by the 1795 Jay Treaty, which allowed Indigenous free passage across the border that separated their established territory.

=== 2001 "anti-globalization" direct action ===
The NYC Ya Basta Collective was a group of anti-globalization activists, based primarily in New York City, active from roughly October 2000 through October 2001.

Initiated in October 2000 by L. Fantoni and T. F. G. Casper on the heels of the anti-International Monetary Fund/World Bank protests in Prague, a collective soon formed and developed its own variation of the Tute Bianche tactic of the padded bloc. The collective organized several actions and events highlighting the inadequacy of borders, in support of immigrant rights and against racism and racialist hate groups.

In April 2001, this collective, along with the Direct Action Network, was active in organizing a US / Canada border crossing over the Three Nations Crossing. This event preceded demonstrations surrounding the 3rd Summit of the Americas, a summit held in Quebec City, Quebec, Canada. An estimated 500 anti-globalists, along with a few Akwesasro꞉non, challenged the legitimacy of the US/Canada border. Although the Collective peacefully crossed into Cornwall, Ontario, Canada, they never made it to Quebec City. Most of the activists who participated in the action at the border and attempted to enter Canadian territory were turned away by Canada Border Service agents and prevented from attending the protests in Quebec City.

=== 2009 border crossing dispute ===
On 1 June 2009, Canada Border Services Agency (CBSA) border services officers at the Cornwall Port of Entry walked off the job in response to encampments of Akwesasro꞉non across the road from the customs facility. The latter were protesting Canada's arming of CBSA border services officers. The encampment, styled as a "unity rally", was branded as a campaign to bring awareness to complaints of alleged human rights abuses committed against Akwesasro꞉non by the CBSA border services officers.

The protest continued for several days but reached its peak at midnight of 1 June, when the new policy of arming border services officers with Beretta Px4 Storm sidearms went into effect. The border services officers left at the end of their shift. A new shift did not arrive, leaving the port of entry vacant.

Cornwall City Police blockaded the north terminus of the Three Nations Bridge to deny travelers entry into Canada. At the request of Canada, the New York State Police likewise blocked access from the United States onto the bridge. Akwesasne was cut off from its major access point into Canada and from free travel within the territory until a temporary border post was erected on July 13, 2009.

Police, border patrol, state troopers, RCMP, and various government agents blocked the road leading to the homes on Cornwall Island, Ontario, from May 2009 until July 2009. Each time any Mohawk attempted to leave their homes or return to their homes in Akwesasne, they were interrogated by government agents. Some Mohawk moved out of their homes because of the stress of this situation. Other residents were ordered to pay costs of $1000 each time CBSA agents chose to impound their vehicles, sometimes more than once per day when residents needed to use their vehicles for several trips. Some residents traveled instead by boat to seek medical attention, or purchase water, and groceries.

=== History of disputes ===
The area has been the scene of several disputes on the rights of the residents to cross the border unimpeded. These issues have been a concern for Canadian authorities, as the area is alleged to be a large-scale, cigarette-smuggling route from the U.S. There have been arrests and seizure of goods in the past. There are also concerns about smuggling of drugs, liquor, and migrants.

Residents of Akwesasne differ over reserve governance and which political factions they support. Political rivalries were expressed after one group brought casino gambling onto the reserve. It brought huge economic returns to casino owners and some benefits to the First Nation, but members also worried about how the enterprise would affect their culture. In 1989 unidentified suspects threw firebombs at a chartered bus. In a separate incident, someone fired a shotgun at a bus in the customs area.

The political feuds have resulted in what's called the Mohawk Civil War: two Mohawk men were killed at Akwesasne in 1990, and thousands of residents left their homes in that period because of attacks on houses and vehicles, and general unrest. The Mohawk Warrior Society, a self-appointed security force, used assault rifles and bats to break up anti-gambling roadblocks at the reservation entrances. They threatened to shoot any outside law enforcement officials if they entered the reservation.

== Arms trafficking and human smuggling ==
According to police sources, the cross-border conduit in Akwesasne is being used by organized crime to smuggle marijuana back into the United States and harder drugs and firearms to Canada. According to a TVA News investigation, the weapons are purchased in the states of Texas, Alabama, Georgia and Florida to be transported north and stored in warehouses on the reserve. On winter nights, smugglers illegally cross the border on snowmobiles along the frozen St. Lawrence River. In the summer, they use motorboats.

In June 2022, the Quebec government announced it will provide $6.2 million over 5 years to the Akwesasne Mohawk Police Service (AMPS) to combat illegal firearm trafficking.

Due to its geography and lack of resources from the Canada Border Services Agency (CBSA), human smuggling has been an ongoing issue for the community. A 1999 Maclean's magazine article outlined how many people of the Akwesasne community facilitated and profited from human smuggling. In 2023, eight people died attempting to cross into the US from Canada. Akwesasne Mohawk Police blamed migrants and other smugglers for exploiting members of their community.

== In popular culture ==
- You Are on Indian Land (2006) is a Canadian documentary written and directed by Mike Kanentakeron Mitchell (Mohawk). A member of the National Film Board of Canada's pioneering Indian Film Crew unit, he directed this documentary about the 1969 protest at Akwesasne. He later was elected as a Grand Chief of Akwesasne.
- Frozen River (2008) is an American drama film written and directed by Courtney Hunt. Set in the North Country (north of Upstate) New York, near Akwesasne and the Canada–US border, it explored an alliance between a Mohawk woman and a white single mother, who both struggle to survive economically. Frozen River was nominated for two Academy Awards: Best Actress (Melissa Leo) and Best Original Screenplay (Courtney Hunt). Misty Upham was nominated for an Independent Spirit Award for Best Supporting Female.
- KANIENʼKEHÁ:KA: Living The Language (2008) is a two-part documentary about the work of the Akwesasne Freedom School and the community in teaching and preserving the Mohawk language. It was produced by Mushkeg Productions Inc. in association with APTN (Aboriginal Peoples Television Network).
- Skydancer (2011), written and directed by Katja Esson, is a full-length documentary about life in Akwesasne and the careers of some of its men in ironworking. The Mohawk of Akwesasne have been among steel workers in New York City and other parts of the US, where they are renowned for their high work in building skyscrapers and bridges. The US/German production was aired on PBS in its America Reframed series, October 2012. The Canadian broadcast premiere was on APTN, part of its Reel Insights, October 2012.
- Mohawk Ironworkers (2016) is a 13-part half-hour documentary series that celebrates the skills of Mohawk ironworkers of Kahnawake, Akwesasne and Six Nations, who are said to be "the best ironworkers on the planet". It is available on APTN.
- Akwesasne was the location of season 2, episode 5, "The Line", for the television series FBI: Most Wanted on CBS. The episode aired on January 26, 2021.

== Notable Akwesasronon ==
- Mary Kawennatakie Adams (1917–1999), textile artist and basket maker
- Ernest Benedict (1918–2011), educator, activist, and chief of the Mohawk Council
- Lou Bruce (1877–1968), baseball player
- Katsi Cook (born 1952), midwife, environmentalist, Native American rights activist, and women's health advocate
- John Kahionhes Fadden (1938–2022), artist and educator
- Alex Jacobs (born 1953), artist, poet, and radio host
- Margaret Jacobs (born 1986), artist
- Kiawentiio (born 2006), actress and singer-songwriter
- Mary Leaf (1925–2004), basket maker
- Mike Kanentakeron Mitchell, politician
- Brandon Oakes (born 1972), actor, artist, and dancer
- Levi Oakes (1925–2019), code talker
- Richard Oakes (1942–1972), activist
- Carey Terrance (born 2005), ice hockey player
- Marlana Thompson (born 1978), beadwork artist, regalia maker, and fashion designer
- Shirley Hill Witt (born 1934), anthropologist, educator, author, civil rights activist, and former foreign service officer

== See also ==
- Declaration on the Rights of Indigenous Peoples
- Ganienkeh
- Haudenosaunee
- Indian Act
- Kanesatake
- Kahnawake
- Tyendinaga
- Wahta
