= Ernest Benedict =

Mohawk educator and activist

Ernest M. Kaientaronkwen Benedict
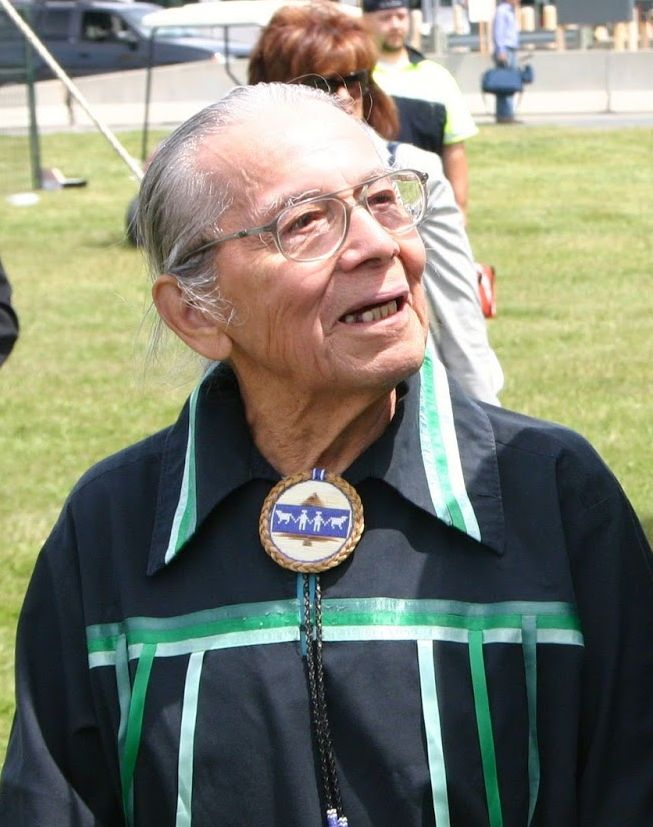
- Ernest M. Kaientaronkwen Benedict, in Akwesasne, 2007
- Born: July 14, 1918; Akwesasne, New York, U.S.
- Died: January 8, 2011 (aged 92)
- Education: St. Lawrence University
- Occupations: Educator; activist; chief
- Known for: Founding the Akwesasne Mohawk Counsellor Organization; Co-founding North American Indian Traveling College; Founding Manitou College; Founding Akwesasne Notes
- Spouse: Florence Hopps (m. 1952)

Ernest M. Kaientaronkwen Benedict (July 14, 1918 – January 8, 2011) was an Akwesasronon educator, activist, and chief of the Mohawk Council.

== Early life ==
Benedict was born on 14 July 1918 to Charles and Julia Jandreau Benedict, members of the Mohawk Nation at Akwesasne. He attended school on the St. Regis Mohawk Reservation, at Bombay, New York, and the Massena Central High School. He married Florence Hopps on 20 September 1952. Benedict received his Bachelors of Arts degree from St. Lawrence University in Sociology. Benedict received an honorary degree from Trent University in 1994.

== Teaching and activism ==
Benedict worked with mentor Ray Fadden-Tehanetorens to organize the Akwesasne Mohawk Counsellor Organization, which visited historical sites while meeting with other Native nations and learning about their heritage while traveling in the eastern part of North America.

Their travels would influence the formation of the White Roots of Peace in the mid-1930s.

Benedict started the North American Indian Traveling College with Michael Kanentakeron Mitchell, as a continuation of the Counsellor Organization.

Benedict founded Manitou College as an attempt to create a college composed of mostly Native Americans. The concept of a degree based on traditional Native knowledge was picked up on by Syracuse University.

He inspired Operation Kanyengehaga, a tutoring program conceived by professor Bob Wells at St. Lawrence University.

Benedict was a lecturer and professor at Trent University, where he later served on the PhD committee for Native Studies candidates.

== Journalism ==
From 1939 until 1941, Benedict was the editor of what was thought to be Akwesasne's first newspaper; the War Whoop. He later worked with the paper Kawehras! ("It Thunders!").

The Akwesasne Notes was started by Benedict in 1968.
