= Cornwall Island (Ontario) =

Island in the Saint Lawrence River in Canada

Coordinates: 45°00′20″N 74°42′59″W

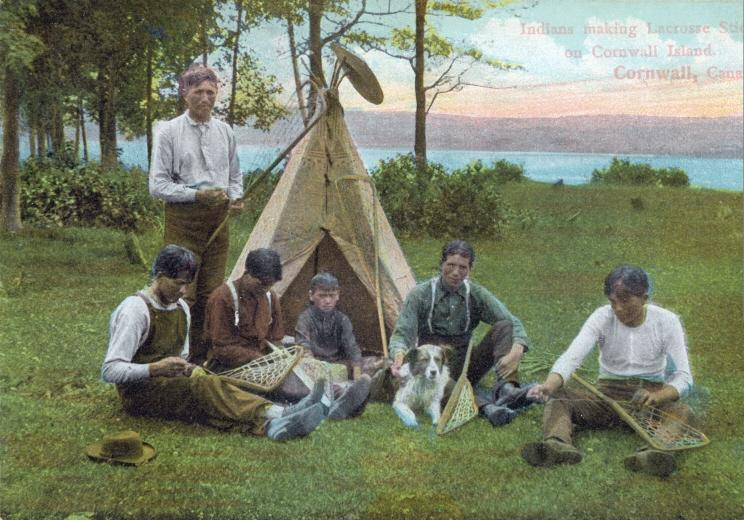
Aboriginals making lacrosse sticks, Cornwall Island, Ontario, c. 1910

Cornwall Island, known in Mohawk as Kawehnò:ke, is an island in the Saint Lawrence River, directly south of the city of Cornwall. The island is located completely within Canada, but it also within Akwesasne 59, a part of the Akwesasne Mohawk reserve, which straddles the Canada–United States border and the Quebec–Ontario border. The Seaway International Bridge, with a channel crossing on each side of the island, provides road access to Cornwall Island from both Canada and the United States.

== Disputes with Canada ==
The area has been the scene of several disputes by Akwesasne residents on their rights to cross the border unimpeded, as provided under the 1795 Jay Treaty. Canadian authorities have been increasingly concerned about large-scale cigarette smuggling along this route. There have been arrests and seizures of goods in the past. There is concern among both of the large nations about smuggling as well of liquor, drugs, and migrants through Akwesasne.

Residents of Akwesasne have had their own internal disputes that have sometimes spilled over into the border area. There is continuing controversy associated with the operation of a Class II gambling casino on the reserve. In 1989 unidentified suspects threw firebombs at a chartered bus. In a separate incident, someone fired a shotgun at a bus in the customs area.

Violence has broken out within the reserve and many residents left in 1990 because of the general unrest. The Warrior Society, a self-appointed security force, used assault rifles and bats to break up anti-gambling roadblocks at the reservation entrances. They threatened to shoot any outside law enforcement officials if they entered the reservation.

=== Canada Border Services Agency dispute ===
==== Border closure ====
On May 1, 2009, the Government of Canada announced that the Canada Border Services Agency (CBSA) will be permitted firearms at all border crossings along the Canada – United States border starting June 1. Mohawk leaders immediately announced their opposition to the policy, stating that they want an exception made in the policy for the Cornwall border crossing because it is located on Mohawk sovereign land. They launched protests against the policy the same day it was announced. The Akwesasne Mohawk said further that they opposed border guards being armed at the Cornwall border post because it is situated in a residential area at a major crossroad where a bus stop, recreational fields, a play area, and several small businesses are located, increasing risk to bystanders.

At midnight on May 30, all border guards at the Cornwall border post left the post, citing safety concerns after hundreds of Mohawk had surrounded the post to protest the new arms policy. Canada closed its border crossing here. The Mohawk protesters said that allowing the border guards to carry firearms violates their sovereignty and increases the likelihood of violent confrontations. Ron Moran, the national president of the Customs and Immigration Union, said that the border was too risky to allow officers to return, and that officers were intimidated by people from Akwesasne who had hidden their faces with scarves.

==== Temporary border opened ====
On June 2, 2009, Akwesasne Mohawk were allowed to cross the Seaway International Bridge, though the Canada border post remained closed. The border remained closed until July 13, when a temporary border post was opened at the north end of the Seaway International Bridge. Bob Kilger, the mayor of Cornwall, Ontario, praised the opening of the temporary border post and hoped for a more permanent resolution of the dispute. The CBSA stated that the border crossing will only reopen if the officers can work there "safely with all of the tools they need to do their job, including their duty firearm."

On June 17, the federal government said it would not reverse its decision to arm border guards. Instead, it was considering moving the border crossing on Cornwall Island closer to the city of Cornwall on the north shore of the Saint Lawrence Seaway. On the same day, a number of Cornwall businesses came to Parliament Hill to ask the federal government to re-open the Cornwall Island border crossing. Closing the border crossing has caused businesses that rely on cross-border traffic to lose revenue.

On September 18, the Mohawk Council of Akwesasne accused the CBSA of seizing vehicles belonging to Mohawk residents who do not report to the new border post and required $1,000 to recover them. However, Immigration and Refugee Protection Act and the Customs Act both state that all travellers entering Canada from the United States are required to report directly to the CBSA temporary border crossing.

On September 19, around 12:30 pm ET, Cornwall police were called to the Seaway International Bridge. They shut down access to the bridge for the next five hours and diverted traffic away from the bridge. The closure was due to the Akwesasne Mohawks protesting the fines issued to members of the Mohawk community who did not report to the temporary border crossing.

==== Current status ====
Visitors from the US entering Cornwall Island are in Canadian territory illegally unless they check in at the relocated Canadian port of entry. US border agents advise visitors who return to the US port of entry without having visited the Canadian one to do so before returning again to the US side, as otherwise they are subject to a C$5,000 fine and vehicle confiscation.

As of 2014, patronage of establishments on Cornwall Island by US residents continues to be sharply curtailed by the requirement that US residents proceed directly to the Canadian customs office north of the river. The Economist commented:

A shopping centre on Cornwall Island in the Canadian bit of Akwesasne, a piece of land set aside for the Mohawk people, shows how changing regimes harm small businesses. When the Mohawks objected to the arming of Canadian guards, Canada moved a customs post north to the mainland. Travellers from the United States now rarely stop until they reach Canadian customs. The change has cost the mall’s sports store C$50,000 a year and has made some units unrentable.

== Education ==
Ahkwesahsne Mohawk Board of Education (AMBE) operates Ahkwesahsne Mohawk School (preschool through middle school) on Cornwall Island.

AMBE agrees to pay tuition for high school students to two school districts in Ontario: Upper Canada District School Board (UCDSB), with AMBE-tuition-paid students going to Cornwall Collegiate and Vocational School and some other UCSDB programs, and Catholic District School Board of Eastern Ontario (CDSBEO), with AMBE-tuition-paid students going to St Joseph's Secondary School and some other CDSBEO programs.

UCDSB categorizes Cornwall Island to be in the district's Ward 11.

== See also ==
- You Are on Indian Land, a 1969 documentary film
