= John Kahionhes Fadden =

Native American illustrator (1938–2022)

- Born: December 26, 1938; Massena, New York, U.S.
- Died: August 12, 2022 (aged 83)
- Spouse: Elizabeth Eva Karonhisake Thompson (m. 1965)
- Children: 3

John Kahionhes Fadden (December 26, 1938 – August 12, 2022) was an Akwesasronon artist and educator whose artworks appeared in over 90 publications, including books, films, and periodicals. His work depicts Haudenosaunee culture and history, as well as the natural beauty of the Adirondack Mountains, where he made his home. In addition to his career as an artist, Fadden taught middle school for over three decades.

== Early life and education ==
Fadden was born on December 26, 1938, in Massena, New York, the only child of Ray and Christine Skawennati "Chubb" Fadden. Raised in the Mohawk community of Akwesasne in Hogansburg, New York, Fadden showed early promise as an artist. His schooling began at the St. Regis Mohawk School and then the White School, and in 1957 he graduated from Massena Central High School. Fadden was accepted into Rochester Institute of Technology, graduating with a Bachelor of Fine Arts degree in 1961.

== Career ==
Fadden helped his parents found the Six Nations Indian Museum (now called the Six Nations Iroquois Cultural Center) in Onchiota, New York when he was 15. After their deaths, Fadden continued their work, running the museum for the rest of his life. He spent every summer lecturing and helping visitors there understand Haudenosaunee culture. Native American journalist and historian Doug George-Kanentiio called the museum "the best private collection of Iroquois memorabilia in the world ... the essence of the Mohawks." Fadden's knowledge of the history and culture of the Haudenosaunee was sought out for documentaries and films, and he was included in documentaries by the Discovery Channel, PBS, National Geographic, and others. In his later years, Fadden worked as a consultant on the hit series Outlander.

After college, Fadden began teaching 7th and 8th grade art at Saranac Central School District. He continued in this role for over three decades, until his retirement in 1994.

Fadden's artwork was featured in nearly 100 publications, films and periodicals. Much of his art depicts various facets of Haudenosaunee culture as well as the Adirondack Mountains. Art exhibitions from New York City to Rotterdam, Netherlands, prominently featured his artwork.

== Personal life ==
Fadden met his wife, Elizabeth Eva Karonhisake Thompson, also Akwesasne, in 1962. They wed in 1965 and later settled in Onchiota, where they raised three sons, Donald, David, and Daniel.

== Death and legacy ==
Fadden died on August 12, 2022, after a brief illness. Referring to his importance to Mohawk awakening, George-Kanentiio wrote that Fadden "had the skill to interpret our stories and dreams in a way which brought enlightenment". Folk singer Pete Seeger cited his visit with Fadden at the Six Nations Iroquois Center as having changed his life by awakening him to his "duties to the earth." It was after Seeger's visit to the center that he became an outspoken advocate for the environment.
