= Alex Jacobs =

Akwesasronon artist, poet, and radio host

- Karoniaktatie
- Born: 1953 (age 72–73); Akwesasne Reservation
- Citizenship: Saint Regis Mohawk Tribe
- Education: Manitou Community College; Institute of American Indian Arts (AFA); Kansas City Art Institute (BFA)
- Known for: Visual art, poetry, Indigenous journalism
- Website: alexjacobsartist.com

Alex Jacobs (born 1953), also known as Karoniaktatie, is an Akwesasronon artist, poet, and radio host. He, along with January Rogers, make up the poetry collective Ikkwenyes. They co-produced the poetry CD Got Your Back. His artwork has been displayed at locations such as the American Indian Archaeological Institute.

== Early life and career ==
Alex Jacobs attended the Manitou Community College at LaMacaza, Quebec, and graduated with an AFA from the Institute of American Indian Arts in Santa Fe. He also attended a summer session at the Alfred College of Ceramics and graduated from the Kansas City Art Institute with a BFA in Sculpture and Creative Writing.

Jacobs worked for the Mohawk Nation newspaper and Akwesasne Notes, an international native journal, as a poetry editor from 1972 to 1974 and a co-editor from 1983 to 1986. He was involved with the founding of the community newspaper, Indian Time, and he co-founded Akwekon, a Native arts journal that he also co-edited from 1985 to 1986. He has worked as a DJ, talk-show host, news director, program director and assistant station manager for CKON, Mohawk Nation Radio.

He taught art and poetry at Akwesasne Freedom School, and was artist-in-residence at the Akwesasne Museum. His art reflects his concern with both the ideal and the real. He explores what it means to be Indian and the creation of the Indian-self. As a Mohawk with land situated across the Canada and U.S. border, he comments on the meaninglessness of borders.

== Poetry ==
Jacobs has put out two poetry collections. His first, Landscape: Old and New Poems, was published in 1984 through Blue Cloud Quarterly Press. His second, Loving... in the Reagan Era, was released in the 1990s. The book is a beat-inspired autobiographical and social examination of the 1980s where Jacobs wrote about his work at a nuclear power plant, his children, Indians, Ronald Reagan's policies, and the truth about the "American Dream". It relates both his personal experience and provides a cultural critique.

In 1979, Jacobs did his first performance piece with an artistic band that consists of other Santa Fe artists called Tribal Dada at the Kansas City Art Institute. The purpose of the group was to create some kind of artistic movement in Santa Fe. The group also performed in 1992. Through the performances of the group, they attempted to convey what Jacobs refers to as the Indian thinking, concepts and conceptual thinking.

== Visual art ==
Todd Moe has likened Jacobs' art to decoupage, as he cuts fabric that came from his mother and grandmother — both quilt makers — and then glues and varnishes it together into a collage.

In the early days, Jacobs also used his mother's calico scraps, cigarette packaging and butter wrappers for material for his art. He created mixed media art collages portraits of Native peoples as a way of countering pop culture images and stereotypes.
