= Mary Kawennatakie Adams =

Akwesasronon artist

- Mary Kawennatakie
- Born: January 24, 1917; Cornwall Island, Ontario, Canada
- Died: May 23, 1999 (aged 82); Akwesasne Mohawk Reserve; Tsi Snaihne (Snye or Chenail), Quebec, Canada
- Known for: Textile artist, basket maker
- Spouse: Michael Adams (m. 1939)
- Children: 12

Mary Kawennatakie Adams (January 24, 1917 – May 23, 1999) was an Akwesasronon textile artist and basket maker.

== Background ==
Adams, a hereditary member of the Mohawk wolf clan, was born on Cornwall Island at Akwesasne on the Mohawk Nation, which straddles the New York/Canadian border.

== Career ==
Her Mohawk name Kawennatakie means "approaching voice." She had no formal education after age 16 and did not learn English until well into adulthood. The Ontario, Canada- born artist's childhood was spent close to her mother and grandmother. At the age of 6, Adams learned from her mother how to process black ash splints and sweetgrass and weave baskets. When she was 10 years old, her mother died, and her father left the reserve to seek employment as an iron worker. Initially, she was locally trading her baskets for needed food and other items, but later learned that trading the baskets for cigarettes and then selling the cigarettes brought in more money. In this way she was able to support herself and her brother. Her brother helped by felling the ash so she could prepare the wood.

Adams married in 1939. She had 12 children, she supported her family with her baskets. Her family was involved in each step (cutting, pounding, cleaning, shaving, braiding) of this endeavor. By the time she was in her early 50s, she was financially independent. She was then able to make baskets that were "imaginative and distinctive" rather than utilitarian. Later, she taught basket making on the Mohawk Reserve at Akwesasne. She traveled widely to give demonstrations of Mohawk basket making.

Adams' dual cultural influences from being Mohawk and Roman Catholic is, in the words of scholar Olivia Thornburn, "interwoven with her splint ash and sweet grass baskets." She was active in St. Regis Catholic Church. Métis scholar Sherry Farrell Racette noted Adam's "skilled execution" in a unique stitch known as the "bird-mouth" stitch, and her skill in "texture created by the innovative application of tiny, miniature baskets."

In 1980, Adams presented Pope John Paul II at the Vatican with a basket specially made to honor the beatification of now Saint Kateri Tekakwitha, a noted 17th-century Mohawk-Algonquian woman. Thornburn described the design of this basket, known as the Pope Basket, as "highly architectural and almost baroque. . ."The design of the basket lid may reflect the papal zucchetto, or skullcap. Also, the shape of the basket is similar to Michelangelo's grand dome of St. Peter's Basilica." The design for this basket came to Adam's in a dream. A replica of the basket, also made by Adams, is at the Smithsonian.

During her life, she produced more than 25,000 baskets. In 1997, she received an award for excellence in Iroquois art from the Iroquois Indian Museum. Adams was included in the 1998 exhibition Crossing the Threshold, focusing on women artists, at the Bernice Steinbaum Gallery.

== Family ==
She married Michael Adams on September 18, 1939. The couple had twelve children.

== Collections ==
Adams's work is in the permanent collections of the Iroquois Indian Museum in New York, the Thunder Bay Art Gallery, the New York State Governor's Collection of Art in Albany, and the Smithsonian American Art Museum.

== Exhibitions ==
Her exhibitions include the Smithsonian Institution; the Museum at the University at Albany, SUNY; the Heard Museum; the National Museum of the American Indian; the Pitt Rivers Museum and the Minneapolis Institute of Art.

== Death ==
Adams continued to make baskets throughout her life. At the time of her death, even with failing eyesight, she was braiding sweet grass for her daughter Trudy, who was also making baskets. In 1999, Mary Adams died at home, in Snye, Quebec, on the Akwesasne Mohawk Reserve.

== Selected bibliography ==
- "Meet the Masters: Akwesasne Basketmakers." North Country Public Radio Online 2008.
- "Mohawk Basketmaking: A Cultural Profile (Review)." American Anthropologist 90.1/2 (1988): 234–235.
- Abbott, Sidney. "Women of the Fourth World: The Women of Sweetgrass, Cedar and Sage Exhibit." Artspace 11.1 (Winter 1986–1987): 22–23.
- Ahlberg, Yohe J, and Teri Greeves. Hearts of Our People. Native Women Artists. Seattle: University of Washington Press, 2019. Print. http://www.worldcat.org/oclc/1105604814
- Barreiro, Jose. Native American Expressive Culture. Ithaca, N.Y.: Akwe:kon Press, American Indian Program, 1994.
- Blue Spruce, Duane & Thrasher, Tanya. The Land Has Memory: Indigenous Knowledge, Native Landscapes, and the National Museum of the American Indian. Washington, District of Columbia: Smithsonian Institution, 2008.
- Cook, Katsi. "A Voice Coming Towards Us: A Tribute to Mohawk Basketmaker Mary Adams." Akwekon Journal 11.1 (1994): 28–29.
- Cook, Katzi. "An Interview With Mohawk Basketmaker Mary Adams." Unbroken Circles: Traditional Arts of Contemporary Woodland Peoples. Edited by S. Dixon. Ithaca, NY: American Indian Program, 1990.
- Folwell, Jody. Hold Everything! Masterworks of Basketry and Pottery From the Heard Museum. Phoenix, Arizona: Heard Museum, 2001.
- Green, Rayna & Fernandez, Melanie. The British Museum Encyclopedia of Native North America. London, England: British Museum Press, 1999.
- Hartigan, Lyndan Roscoe. Made with Passion; The Hemphill Folk Art Collection Washington: Smithsonian Institution & National Museum of American Art, 1990.
- Keating, Neal. Mary Adams: An Exhibition of Her Work, October 5 Through December 14, 1997. Howes Cave, New York: Iroquois Indian Museum, 1997.
- LaPlantz, Shereen. Plaited Basketry: The Woven Form. Bayside, Cal.: Press de LaPlantz, 1982.
- Mowat, Linda et al. Basketmakers: Meaning and Form in Native American Baskets. Oxford: Pitt Rivers Museum, 1992.
- Porter, Frank W. ed. The Art of Native American Basketry: A Living Legacy. New York: Greenwood Press, 1990.
- Pulleyn, Rob. The Basketmaker's Art: Contemporary Baskets and Their Makers. Asheville, N.C.: Lark Books, 1992.
- Racette, Sherry Farrell. Looking for Stories and Unbroken Threads: Museum Artifacts as Women's History and Cultural Legacy. Restoring the Balance: First Nations Women, Community, and Culture Winnipeg: University of Manitoba Press, 2009.
- Reno, Dawn E. Contemporary Native American Artists. Brooklyn, New York: Alliance Publishing, 1995.
- Richter, Paula Bradstreet. Wedded Bliss: The Marriage of Art and Ceremony. Salem, Massachusetts: Peabody Essex Museum, 2008.
- Steinbaum, Bernice. Crossing the Threshold: Invitational Group Exhibition: Mary Adams Mary ... [et al.] New York: Steinbaum Krauss Gallery, 1997.
- Stock, Michele. Iroquois Basketry Thrives: Reports on a NYFS Mentoring Project New York Folklore Society Newsletter 20.1/2 (1999): 15.
- Teleki, Gloria Roth. Collecting Traditional American Basketry. New York: Dutton, 1979.
- Weatherford, Elizabeth et al. Native Americans on Film and Video, Volume 1. New York: Museum of the American Indian/Heye Foundation, 1981.
- Young, Jane M. "Film Reviews." Journal of American Folklore 97.385 (Jul.-Sept, 1984): 382–383.
