= Mike Kanentakeron Mitchell =

Canadian Mohawk politician, filmmaker and lacrosse builder

- Occupations: Film director; politician

Mike Kanentakeron Mitchell (or simply Mike Mitchell) is a longtime Canadian Mohawk politician, pioneering First Nations film director and a leading figure in First Nations lacrosse. First elected to the Mohawk Council of Akwesasne in 1982, he began his first term as Grand Chief in 1984. He served on the Mohawk Council almost continuously for more than 30 years, having been reelected as Grand Chief as recently as 2012.

Prior to entering politics, Mitchell studied and directed films with the National Film Board as part of its Indian Film Crew. Invited to be an active part of the Challenge for Change program, he got involved in the border crossing dispute. His films include the documentary You Are on Indian Land (1969), about the 1969 Akwesasne border crossing dispute. A student at the time, working with a staff member of the NFB who had official authority over the project, he later received directorial credit almost 50 years after the film's completion.

Mitchell said his experience in making You Are on Indian Land blurred the lines between filmmaking and politics:

I was filming the meetings, but I was also asking questions and giving my own views, and I soon became identified as one of the spokesmen [for the community]; they asked that I be part of the delegation that was going to Ottawa. So I was really playing both sides at the time.

— Tracey,

Mitchell directed several more films on First Nations issues at the NFB. Next he worked with the North American Indian Traveling College (now Ronathahonni Cultural Centre) to set up replica of a traditional Mohawk settlement on Kawehno:ke (Cornwall Island). He also produced educational material and videos that helped to spread Native culture awareness.

Mitchell was one of several First Nations filmmakers honoured at a retrospective screening on February 25, 2017, at TIFF Bell Lightbox. He said that he is retired from politics after three decades and multiple terms as Grand Chief, and intends to resume filmmaking.

Mitchell is the winner of a 2016 Indspire Award for his life in politics.

== Lacrosse ==
Born into a lacrosse family, Mitchell played in the St. Regis, Cornwall Island and Cornwall Minor Lacrosse systems of eastern Ontario and western Quebec.

Mitchell revived the Akwesasne Minor Lacrosse Association, which enabled local Mohawk teams to once again compete in the Ontario Minor Lacrosse Association. He also formed the Iroquois Lacrosse Association. In 1993, Mitchell was appointed to the Canadian Lacrosse Association's Board of Directors.

In 2003, he was inducted into the Canadian Lacrosse Hall of Fame as a Special Contributor. In June 2014, he received the Lester B. Pearson Award from the Canadian Lacrosse Association for his work as "a leader, a contributor, an advocate and relentless promoter of the game."
