= Akwesasne Cultural Center =

- 44.978823°N 74.69369°W
- Location: 321 State Rte 37, Hogansburg, New York, United States
- Type: Public library system of community of Akwesasne.

Collection
- Items collected: business directories, phone books, maps, government publications, books, periodicals, genealogy, local history,
- Size: 2,000 photographic objects; 700 ethnographic objects, of which over 300 are baskets; 28,000 books. The Native Collection of 2,400 volumes.
- Criteria for collection: about the Mohawk Nation community of Akwesasne.

The Akwesasne Cultural Center houses a library and museum about the Mohawk Nation community of Akwesasne. Opening in 1971, the Akwesasne Library was the first Native American Library east of the Mississippi River. The museum houses 2,000 photographic objects and over 700 ethnographic objects, of which over 300 are baskets. Black ash splint and sweetgrass basketry is part of the Akwesasne Mohawk identity. The library has a collection of more than 28,000 books, with a wealth of online resources available due to being a part of the "Clinton, Essex, Franklin County (CEF) library system". The Native Collection is one of the largest in Northern New York with over 2,400 volumes.

The Center is located at 321 State Rte 37, Hogansburg, New York.
