= General Vanier Intermediate School =

General Vanier Secondary School

Location
- 1500 Cumberland St. Cornwall, Gateway Region, Ontario; Canada; 45.03636°N 74.75053°W

Information
- School type: High school
- Motto: Once A Viking Always A Viking!
- Founded: 1962
- School board: UCDSB
- Principal: Robert Currier
- Grades: 9 - 13
- Enrollment: 700
- Language: English, French immersion, Mohawk language
- Campus: Suburban
- Colours: Maroon and Gray
- Website: gvis.ucdsb.on.ca

General Vanier Secondary School (GVIS) was a public intermediate school located in Cornwall, Ontario, Canada. Due to a decline in student enrollment, the school was closed in the fall of 2011 and its students transferred to Cornwall Collegiate and Vocational School (CCVS). The Catholic high school St. Joseph's Secondary School (SJSS) is attached and continues to share the school grounds.

== History ==
General Vanier Secondary School (GVSS) was opened to students in the fall of 1967 to house students from the overcrowded CCVS and Saint Lawrence High School. It was named in honour of the 19th Governor General of Canada Georges Vanier. The first two graduating classes, of 1969 and 1970, were temporarily housed at other locations, during the construction of the new high school.

It was a grades 9–13, then grades 9-12 high school when the Government of Ontario decided to eliminate grade 13. In 2002 grades 11-12 were transferred to CCVS and grades 7 and 8 remained at GVSS. The school was thereafter known as General Vanier Intermediate School.

To coincide with the school's closing, there was a homecoming reunion held on the weekend of July 22, 2011.

== Students ==
The approximately 500 students, affectionately called the "General Vanier Vikings", came from a wide array of ethnic and socio-economic backgrounds. Approximately half of the school was white with the other half being either native Mohawk students from nearby Akwesasne or from the growing immigrant community.

== Extra-Curricular activities ==
Many activities are available to students including concerts and jazz bands, Drama, and many different sports. GVIS competes against other teams in Stormont, Dundas, and Glengarry and often competes in EOSSA finals.

== Famous and Notable Alumni and Staff ==
- Chad Kilger - Hockey Player, Toronto Maple Leafs
- Lori Dupuis - Gold Medal-Winning Olympian (hockey)
- Dale Hawerchuk - Hockey Player, Hockey Hall of Fame, Winnipeg Jets
