= Arthur Montour Sr. =

Arthur Montour Sr. (1942-2017) was an American Indian and Mohawk Tribe leader, also known as Kakwirakeron. In 1989, Montour was involved in a number of encounters between the New York State Police and the Warrior Society, a group of Mohawks living on the St. Regis Reservation who believe in the sovereignty of the Mohawk Nation.

== Early life ==
Montour was born June 26, 1942, in Buffalo, New York to Martin and Belva Montour. He was the oldest of 6 siblings. Montour was raised in Kahnawake among other Mohawk people. At age 17, he began traveling the country as an ironworker. He became foreman and led crews building bridges and high rise buildings in New York City.

== Political figure ==
During the 1980s, The St. Regis Mohawk Reservation in upstate New York was undergoing multiple land disputes. Many Mohawk tribe members were claiming to be leaders and giving contradictory direction. Montour became a voice for the Mohawk tribe, as he helped oppose the FBI and New York Police entering the reservation to serve search warrants. Montour took part in a series of strategized roadblocks to halt the intrusions.

=== June 6, 1989 roadblock ===
In the late evening hours of June 6, 1989, FBI and New York State Police officers traveled onto the St. Regis Reservation to carry out search and arrest warrants, in an effort to end gambling in the territory. While search warrants were executed during the early evening, two state patrol vehicles were blocked by protestors from entering the reservation later that night. Montour spoke with the authorities and explained that police raids on the reservation were an obtrusion to Mohawk sovereignty. Montour agreed to remove the roadblock and stop Warrior Society patrols for a five day period, in an attempt to ease the tensions between civilians and law enforcement. More search warrants were carried out the next day.

=== July 20, 1989 roadblocks ===
A little over a month later, Montour orchestrated another series of roadblocks in the early morning hours of July 20, 1989. Approximately 50 FBI agents and 150 NYPD officers attempted to execute 11 federal arrest warrants, 6 federal search warrants, and one criminal summons. As the law enforcement officers made their way to the reservation, they were met with a roadblock consisting of about 4 to 6 vehicles and roughly 20 Native American armed with high powered rifles. As New York State Police Captain Kenneth Cook exited his vehicles and approached the roadblock, he witnessed Montour fleeing the roadblock and driving away into the reservation. Cook approached the roadblock and a number of armed Native Americans stepped forward in front of the roadblock and yelled for the officers to not get any closer and to turn around and leave the reservation. Cook disclosed that he was there to execute federal search warrants but was told they would be harmed if they did not leave.

While this was going on, another FBI agent was able to make it to a location behind the roadblock. Once Special Agent Greene exited his vehicle, he was told to get back in his vehicle and leave the reservation. The agents and officers at the roadblock turned around and drove away from the roadblock to search for an alternate route onto the reservation, where they found another road block. Major Brooks ordered all law enforcement officials to hold their positions and contacted Montour on a cellphone. Montour said that the roadblocks would remain in their current locations but negotiations could be worked out. All search warrants were carried out except for locations at TVI and Bear's Den where to roadblocks were situated.

=== Indictments ===
Montour was indicted on three separate charges related to the roadblocks. His charges were:

- A conspiracy to interfere forcibly with the execution of search warrants.
- The forcible interference with the execution of a search warrant, and the use of a deadly weapon in the commission of that act.
- The use of a firearm during a crime of violence.

After the nine-day trial that found Montour guilty of these acts, he was sentenced to 10 months imprisonment. This sentence was to be established for all three charges and all sentences were to be served concurrently.

== Personal life and death ==
Montour had 13 children, 59 grandchildren, and 36 great-grandchildren. Montour died on October 31, 2017.
