= Levi Oakes =

Canadian-born Mohawk code talker (1925–2019)

Louis Levi Oakes (January 23, 1925 – May 28, 2019) was a Canadian-born Mohawk code talker who served in the United States Army and member of the Akwesasne Mohawk Nation. He was the last living Mohawk code talker.

== Early years and military service in World War II ==
Oakes was born on January 23, 1925, on the Quebec side of the Akwesasne Reserves that straddles Quebec, Ontario and New York. He belonged to the Haudenosaunee Turtle Clan.

He worked as a steel worker in Buffalo, New York, and enlisted in the United States Army in 1944. He served with the 442nd Signal Heavy Construction Battalion in Western New Guinea, then Luzon, Philippines and finally in the post-war occupation of Japan before ending his service in 1946.

== Post-war and later years ==
After the war he returned to work as a steel worker at construction sites in Buffalo and New York City. After three decades in Buffalo Oakes returned to the Akwesasne Reserves to work on equipment in road construction projects. Oakes died in Snye, Quebec on May 28, 2019.

Oakes received a Silver Star.

== Personal ==
Oakes was married and had 10 children. His brother Sam Oakes also served in the Pacific War not far from where he was stationed.

== Awards ==
- Silver Star
