= Akwesasne Task Force on the Environment =

Mohawk Nation environmental organization

The Akwesasne Task Force on the Environment (ATFE) is a community-based grassroots activist organization developed to address issues of environmental justice and contamination within the Mohawk Nation of Akwesasne. Its mission is to preserve the Mohawk community's spiritual, cultural and biological integrity through activism, advocacy, and collaborative research. They achieve their efforts through projects related to political advocacy, environmental education and by conducting culturally-sensitive research to address the consequences of environmental injustices. The ATFE's influence has extended to surrounding public schools and has contributed to discussions on the introduction of Indigenous Knowledge into mainstream science curricula in the United States.

== History ==
=== History of the ATFE and environmental injustice ===
In 1954, the construction of the St. Lawrence Seaway began with the intent to facilitate economic and industrial growth in upper New York State. Project developers and government administrators directly violated treaties made with the Haudenosaunee Confederacy by developing on Akwesasne land, which is culturally and historically rooted on the St. Lawrence River. During the 1950s, fostering economic prosperity in less populated areas via industrial development was not unique to the upper New York region. The political climate under Eisenhower was characterized largely by the endorsement and prevalence of technological growth and advancement. Environmental justice scholarship asserts that indigenous populations, including the Akwesasne, are disproportionately exposed to the negative consequences of these economic advancements due to their lack of political agency and perceived inferiority. For example, in the wake of the St. Lawrence Seaway construction, Eisenhower's executive assistant, John Hamlin, referred to Native Americans as a "national problem", a "less productive society" that was blocking the American vision of progress. These remarks are reflective of the Eisenhower administration's disregard for indigenous bodies and spaces, and the general attitudes of the time period that willed economic development over Native rights and voices.

In late 1950s, developers built a hydroelectric dam on the St. Lawrence River, attracting industries to the Seaway located near Akwesasne territory. Three of the major industries to join the Seaway after its construction included General Motors, Reynolds Metals, and Aluminum Company of America. These companies were situated upstream of the Akwesasne, and have collectively formed one of the largest chemically contaminated sites in the U.S. The industries contribute pollutants such as polychlorinated biphenyls (PCBs), polyaromatic hydrocarbons, phenols, as well as metals and organic matter. General Motors, in particular, has caused significant damage to the Akwesasne community, due to their use of PCBs in the aluminum production process. In 1978, PCBs were deemed a hazardous substance by the Clean Water Act, and banned by the Toxic Substances Control Act for their detrimental effects on human and environmental health, which have been associated with reproductive failure, liver damage, and skin disease. The EPA fined General Motors for illegal usage of PCBs, prioritizing the site as a national Superfund site. However, they failed to follow through with many of the regulations and clean-up sanctions that were promised. For example, the Akwesasne community lobbied for the complete removal of General Motors toxic landfill, located within 500 yards of tribal land. These requests were denied by the EPA and the landfill was capped instead; a less-costly but significantly less effective solution to toxic contamination. This led to the ATFE being conceived in 1987, as a means to address environmental concerns, gain political agency, and remain actively involved in clean-up efforts and decision-making processes. According to the ATFE's research advisory committee, full cultural and environmental restoration will not occur until the EPA actively collaborates with Mohawk people in decision-making and Superfund clean-up processes.

=== Mission statement ===
"The mission of the Akwesasne Task Force on the Environment is to, conserve, preserve, protect, and restore the environment, natural and cultural resources within the Mohawk territory of Akwesasne in order to promote the health and survival of the sacred web of life for future generations and to fulfill our responsibilities to the natural world as our Creator instructed."

== Goals and beliefs ==
The ATFE aims to contribute to natural and cultural resources, address the environmental problems such as those the Mohawk Nation faces, and mitigate the effects of current environmental issues through sustainable practices, research, and advocacy. These goals are accomplished under a culturally relevant framework that emphasizes the sacredness and interconnectedness of the land, and the subsequent need to restore and protect it.

Specifically, the ATFE aims to:

- Develop training, education and advocacy programs
- Address community concerns about industrial pollution from nearby ALCOA, General Motors, and Reynolds Aluminum
- Implement strategies to restore environmental and community health
- Support culturally appropriate sustainable development projects
- Conduct and support scientific research including sampling and testing for toxicants
- Network with other Native communities, environmental and legal professionals

== Cultural and spiritual foundation ==
The Akwesasne people are intimately interconnected with their environment, which for centuries has served as the basis of their spiritual and cultural heritage. The ATFE sites the St. Lawrence River as the "lifeblood" of their homeland, meaning it serves as a cultural and life-sustaining source of food, agricultural fertility, medicine, and spiritual tradition within their community.

Akwesasne rejected the Saint Lawrence waterway construction because it broke relations between them and other peoples, especially the Dutch who had an agreement called kahswenhtha. The generations long relationship with nonhuman nature was also interrupted.The Akwesasne received little compensation and no political voice in the building of the waterway due to the fact that the ownership of the land they reside on is still being disputed at the state and federal level. The Mohawk emphasize the inter-relatedness of life and actions. The construction of the waterway not only impacted the environment, as sea life were increasingly contaminated with toxins, but the community began to lose associations with their language and culture, their connection to their Creator. The Akwesasne community maintains that when the environment is mistreated, the delicate balance between the land and the people is threatened, and both experience a devastating loss.

== Structure of ATFE ==
In 1995, the Research Advisory Committee (RAC) was developed to address the sudden influx of research initiatives within the ATFE, and more specifically to establish a structured and formalized set of guidelines to review research proposals. This was officially known as the Protocol for Review of Environmental and Scientific Research Proposals. These protocols are guided by three fundamental ideals: peace, good mind, and strength. More specifically, the Mohawk people believe that these three principles are interconnected, such that striving for peace promotes peace of mind, which in turn requires strength to develop. Collectively, these three ideals serve to create a basis for reviewing and conducting research. The ATFE, in addition, stresses the importance of equity, empowerment, and mutual respect, all principles that are central to the organization and structural functioning of the task force, and crucial to the research and collaboration process. One of the primary goals of the ATFE is to create a culturally sensitive research environment that fosters inclusion and active participation of all community members. Thus the mutual and equitable collaboration of community members, scientists, and committee members alike is prioritized in the RAC, serving to give each participant a sense of empowerment and agency. Moreover, in considering research initiatives, the ATFE makes an active effort to facilitate equal distribution of power and resources, value all perspectives and contributions, and produce research that has direct benefits for community members.

== Research initiatives ==
The ATFE participates and encourages research that is culturally sensitive and supports their environmental justice concerns, including the health effects of polychlorinated biphenyls (PCBs) on the Mohawk Nation. To address concerns many Native Americans have over environmental hazards, the EPA has produced implements called risk assessment and risk management process. These implements were supposed to help manage the amount of toxins in the Natives' environment but they have failed the Native Americans. As such, the ATFE has committed to maintaining active involvement in decision-making processes, and has started a movement called "The First Environmental Restoration" funded by the National Institute of Environmental and Health Services (NIEHS) in order to come up with a resolution to address toxicant issues facing the Mohawk territory of Akwesasne. More specifically, "The First Environmental Restoration" is a uniquely community-based initiative that emphasizes the protection of health and traditional culture.

The fish that Akwesasne Mohawks traditionally eat are contaminated with PCBs due to General Motors, ALCOA, and Reynolds Metals spillage upstream in the Saint Lawrence River. One study evaluated 335 Akwesasne adults, roughly a quarter of the population, examining the total serum levels in the blood of Native adults and the self-reported rates of cardiovascular disease in the participants. It showed that this population had about 3 times higher background levels of PCBs when compared to the near nonexistent levels in the general US population. The study concluded that PCBs increase the cholesterol and triglyceride synthesis in P450 enzymes. Increased cholesterol and triglycerides have, in previous studies, been shown as a risk factor for cardiovascular disease. Along with this, the study found that body mass index (BMI) and age were significantly correlated with the PCB levels in individuals.

Toxicants have also threatened the reproduction of indigenous women, their families and communities as a whole. The ATFE maintains that exploring the intersectionality of environmental justice and reproductive justice will result in a deeper focus on and understanding of their environment. Moreover, research on the reproductive health of women correlate the same environmental issues addressed by the ATFE. Research on the presence of endocrine-disrupting chemicals (EDCs), such as PCBs, allow scientists to understand how the lifestyles of Mohawk cultures are impacting not only the health of those consuming contaminated species, but jeopardize the future of the nation as a whole. EDCs in young women in the Akwesasne community drastically decreased the women's ability to ovulate. Therefore, issues of reproductive justice are closely linked with the environmental contamination issues. Such scientific findings reveal an apparent correlation between numerous issues in Akwesasne communities and their contaminated environments. Further research into the impacts of persistent organic pollutants (POPs) in Akwesasne communities through a reproductive perspective revealed higher levels of pollutants in the blood of Akwesasne youth than non-Native groups in the same areas. Due to the lifestyle and culture of the Akwesasne, their likelihood to be exposed to the contaminated natural resources in their area are significantly higher than that of an average US citizen. Such contamination levels within the Akwesasne community differed based on the activities of the mother and the mother's history of breastfeeding her child or not. Reproductive justice must then be considered over many generations in order to adequately assess the impact of exposure in such communities, as POPs build up in bodily systems over time. Such is evidence to prove the continuation of contamination in the Mohawk nation, despite the EPA and federal governments efforts at improving the health of those communities. These findings offer a unique aim, focused on mothers, in Akwesasne research that more accurately depicts the assessment of risk in a region than the male body. Justice needs are beyond the equality of protection. "Using intersectionality as an analytic lens helps us to understand how individuals are differently affected by outside forces based on the varying combinations of their identities – race, class, gender, sexuality, and citizenship".

== Collaborations and partnership research ==
The ATFE partners with a number of higher education institutions to produce collaborate and culturally sensitive research that provides benefits for both scholars and tribe members. The research conducted by the ATFE provides knowledge on health perspectives, the environment, and justice among the people most impacted by toxic contaminants in the St. Lawrence River region. Researchers at the University at Albany, SUNY performed collaborative research with the nation to better understand the community, exposure levels and the cultural significance of the activities and lifestyle which contaminate Akwesasne people. Since a large portion of the US government's responses to high correlations in industrial pollution and negative health of the Akwesasne people and environment are met with a request to change their lifestyle practices, this research offers a perspective on the lives of these people so that the US can better understand why this solution is insufficient. The development of the Seaway in the 1950s in the St. Lawrence River has contributed to decades of contamination accumulation in the bodies of those eating fish and other food near the river, and receiving breast milk from mothers with contaminants in their bodies. At this point, it is clear what has caused the negative health changes in the community, and this research helps to draw attention to the need for the US government to develop a new assessment of risk to understanding the build-up of these chemicals over time, and the impact they may already have for the next generation of Akwesasne. Collaboration with US institutions provides a connection and possibility for quicker results for changes in understanding, attitude and policies impacting the Akwesasne.

In addition, the ATFE's research focuses on the harmful effects of PCBs, which have contaminated the St. Lawrence River as a result of the heavy concentration of industry residing upstream from the community. The Akwesasne Task Force on the Environment analyzed the relationship between PCB congeners and neurological function and ability in adolescents. This study compared 271 Mohawk mother and child (aged 10–16) pairs through a massive array of psychological and neurological tests, as well as a fasted blood sample. The psychological and neurological tests were chosen with cultural consideration. The blood samples were analyzed for cholesterol, triglyceride, and serum lipid concentrations of PCB congeners. 16 of the 209 congeners of PCB had high enough rates of detection to be analyzed and were grouped based on the congeners structural similarity to dioxins and the persistence. The two long-term memory exam scores correlated strongly with rates of all four categories of congeners which means there is a high probability that PCB effects long-term memory

== Advocacy and activism ==
=== Education ===
The ATFE emphasizes formal education in school curricula and community based cultural education. The historical colonization of indigenous groups has excluded their history, culture and perspectives from the mainstream American formal education system. The incorporation of Traditional Knowledge (TK) into US formal schooling was mutually beneficial for both Native and non-Native groups in the US. An accurate understanding of the past allows students to better analyze contemporary issues. Through a formal partnership with SUNY Potsdam and the Salmon River Central School District, situated on Mohawk land, the Akwesasne community works to facilitate collaboration among community members and public school teachers to develop culturally relevant curriculum for Mohawk students. The benefits of a more holistic understanding of environmental processes exist within Traditional Knowledge (TK) and Western notions of science and ecosystems. U.S. politics, however, interact with the Akwesasne nations in a manner which ignores knowledge about the degree of interrelatedness of ecosystems and toxin build up in organisms over time. The ATFE argues that introducing TK to formal education in the United States could help blend scientific endeavors with power—socially, economically and politically. Scientific collaboration between US institutions and the Akwesasne Mohawk Nation have already revealed the importance of understanding not only contamination levels in Mohawk bodies, but the lifestyles and beliefs which contribute to their significance and continue to create meaning for the communities despite the negative health impacts. To begin, students with such perspectives would allow for quicker and more efficient results to come of interactions between the federal government and indigenous nations in the coming generations. Additionally, the inclusion of TK in formal schooling gives autonomy and a sense of belonging to Native American students, who have been largely overwritten, ignored and/or marginalized in other ways via the national school system and our incomplete telling of history leading to contemporary issues. The introduction of TK into scientific studies, in a formal education setting, would begin to facilitate the meshing of soft and hard sciences, of humanities and STEM research, so that the United States can maximize its potential for human expansion and justice. They also sponsor educational programs on traditional fishing and trapping called "Life skills on Land".

=== ATFE and the political economy of the United States ===
Neoliberalism and environmental justice are two theoretical frames that play a role in the indigenous community. Shifting towards a neoliberalist market would compromise the mission of sovereignty expressed by so many First Nations. Since the beginning of the 21st century this new form of environmental governance has gained mainstream popularity. Therefore, Native Americans, including the Akwesasne, have questioned the decision to prioritize a different environmental activism framework which is more aligned with Mohawk values and lifestyles. Through education programs, the ATFE has sought a reformed political framework which legitimized Traditional Knowledge (TK) over the positivist scientific framework which dominates environmental work in the US. TK can be used to reimagine First Nation boundaries to include the ecosystems which run through such borders. In general, the holistic approach of TK works to protect the natural resources and health of entire ecosystems, including the human members living off of those resources. By promoting indigenous knowledge in Native and non-Native school systems, the Mohawk perspective begins to be included in issues of sovereignty and environmental justice issues. As more students are exposed to differing systems of knowledge in a legitimate setting, there is a higher chance that those principles can be adopted by the future generations into policy related to indigenous populations within the United States. Traditional Knowledge offers a Native perspective on issues such as sovereignty, self-determination, autonomy and agency among the community.

== Ongoing projects ==
The ATFE research initiatives are the launch pad for actualizing a goal of the group—to develop a community-based research database. Because the Akwesasne control all aspects of conducting the research, the group is able to express cultural values of respect regarding the intent of their research, their subjects and how their findings can contribute toward actualizing goals of environmental justice. As sovereignty is essential in understanding to issues of First Nations within the US, these research projects exemplify the ability of First Nations to address their own concerns without the intervention of the mainstream American society. Resolving issues with respect, equity, and empowerment is something that the Akwesasne Task Force on the Environment lives by. Through these three standards, the task force is able to address their own ideas of risk assessment, data and potential solutions through a culturally appropriate methodology.

The ATFE on the Environment has lessened the effects of pollution on the community while simultaneously preserving Mohawk culture through efforts in maintaining multiple aquaculture facilities. These facilities produce pollutant free fish species for the local community to eat, allowing for the continuation of their cultural practices.

The major projects and current focus areas of the ATFE include:

- Advocacy
  - Research initiatives by the ATFE have built the foundation for the group to connect with the wider community to inform the public about the Akwesasne issues from their own perspectives. ATFE has advocated for the introduction of Traditional Knowledge in formal schooling in order to expand the perspectives of the future leaders of this country. These efforts have impacted both Native and non-Native students, and offer an alternative perspective on the environment which could promote more thoughtful and holistic approaches to handling natural resources in the future.
- Aquaculture Project
  - The task force has worked to produce aquaculture labs in order to provide the community with non-contaminated fish species for consumption. This initiative works to temporarily address the issue of consuming contaminated, yet cultural significant species while the Task Force works toward reversing the contamination to the St. Lawrence River ecosystem. Because the research initiative was born within the Akwesasne community, its efforts approach food insecurity from both a short and long-term perspective to ensure the health of the existing community.
- Black Ash Project
  - The Asian emerald ash borer was introduced to the United States in the 1990s. Since then, these ash borers have threatened the ash tree populations. Ash trees, specifically, the black ash, is used in Native American basket weaving which has economic and cultural importance to the tribes. This study collected and analyzed the responses of Native American Tribes to this invasion and how they sought to mitigate the effects the ash borer could have. The Akwesasne Task Force on the Environment, in particular, started the "Black Ash Project". This project educated the community on black ash seed collection and even organized 21 seed collections in 2009.
- Cultural Resource Program
- Environmental Education
- Environmental Laboratory
- Fruit Tree Project
  - Seed giveaways of native trees
- Maple Sugar Project
- Medicine Plant Restoration Project
- Research and Partnerships
- Sustainable Agriculture Program
- Sweet Grass Project
- Traditional Medicines
- Wild Rice Project
