= Holy Trinity Catholic Secondary School (Cornwall, Ontario) =

Location
- 18044 Tyotown Road; Cornwall, Ontario, K6H 5S7; Canada; 45.0454°N 74.6731°W

Information
- School type: Catholic High School
- Motto: “In Teaching we Learn in Faith we Grow!”
- Religious affiliation: Catholic
- Founded: 2004
- School board: Catholic District School Board of Eastern Ontario
- School number: 715190
- Principal: Nancy McIntyre
- Grades: 7 to 12
- Enrollment: 535 (2024)
- Language: English
- Colours: Gold and green
- Mascot: Falcon
- Website: holytrinityfalcons.cdsbeo.on.ca

Holy Trinity Catholic Secondary School is a Catholic high school in Cornwall, Ontario, Canada. It is managed by the Catholic District School Board of Eastern Ontario.

== Sports ==
The secondary school is represented in many different intramural sports offered in Grade 7-12 as the “Holy Trinity Falcons.”

Sports include: soccer, track and field, badminton, golf, basketball, hockey, tennis, volleyball, cross-country, and football.

== See also ==
- Education in Ontario
- List of secondary schools in Ontario
