= Margaret Jacobs (artist) =

Native American artist

Margaret E. Jacobs is a Native American artist and member of the Akwesasne Mohawk tribe, known for her steel sculptures, powdercoated jewelry, and drawings. She draws inspiration from her culture and upbringing. She values natural and synthetic objects and is inspired by buildings in the United States; they are a reminder of Mohawk ironworkers who left their tribes and communities to help build structures. Most of Jacobs' work has been based on the history of the Mohawks, her cultural heritage, and stories.

== Early life and education ==
Margaret E. Jacobs was born into the Akwesasne Mohawk tribe on September 10, 1986, in Ogdensburg, New York. Her family was "hands on" and she began to make things at an early age. She attended the Ogdensburg Free Academy, from which she graduated in 2004. She then attended Dartmouth College, where she received her bachelor's degree in Visual Arts and received the school's Perspectives design award. Jacobs is inspired by the artist Sandy Skoglund.

== Artworks ==
=== Steel Medicine ===
Steel Medicine was an exhibition of steel sculptures on display from June 8, 2019, to April 26, 2020, in the Boise Art Museum, in Boise Idaho. Jacobs mentions it speaks on adaptation and cultural identity.

=== Old Growth Series 2019 ===
In 2019 Jacobs had designed the Old Growth series. It references medicinal plants and Mohawk tools. These sculptures contain elements from traditional Mohawk stories.

=== Shedding Armor ===
A steel sculpture resembling a turtle shell. Jacobs' use of base metals to prevent chips and scratches and the use of powder coating to provide raw natural colors to the shell.

== Exhibitions ==
=== Solo exhibitions ===
- 2024 Botanic, Salem Art Works, NY
- 2024 Kinship, Burlington City Arts, Burlington, VT
- 2015 Fact and Fiction. Studio Place Arts, Barre, VT
- 2016 Lost & Found, Scavenger Gallery, White River Jct, VT
- 2018 New York, Hirschey Family Gallery, Frederic Remington Art Museum
- 2019 Steel Medicine, Boise Art Museum, Boise, ID

=== Group exhibitions ===
- 2025-26 Future Imaginaries: Indigenous Art, Fashion, Technology, Autry Museum of the Southwest, Los Angeles, CA
- 2009 NHAA College Show, Robert Lincoln Levy Gallery, Portsmouth, NH
- 2009 Chautauqua: A Continuum of Creativity, Denise Bibro Fine Art, New York, NY
- 2009 A Necessary Thaw, Perspectives on Design, Jaffe-Friede Gallery, Dartmouth College, Hanover, NH
- 2010 Artist Residency, Vermont Studio Center, Johnson, VT
- 2016 SculptureFest 2016, Woodstock VT
- 2017 25th Annual Indian Market and Festival, Eiteljorg Museum, Indianapolis, IN
- 2018 Smithsonian NMAI Native Art Market, Washington, DC
- 2019 SWAIA, Santa Fe Railyard Park, NM

== Honors and awards ==
- 2024 Rural and Traditional Arts Fellowship (RTAF), New York State Council on the Arts and the Arts Council for Wyoming County
- 2023 ICI (Independent Curators International) Curatorial Research Fellow, New York, NY
- 2023 UCROSS Artist Residency, Clearmont, WY
- 2018 Rebecca Blunk Fund Award, New England Foundations for the Arts (NEFA)
- 2019 First Peoples Fund, Artist in Business Leadership
- 2019 Special Projects Grant, New England Foundation for the Arts (NEFA)
- 2019 Innovate Grant, Spring Cycle
- 2015 Native American Residency Fellowship

== Publications ==
Jacobs' artwork is included in multiple outlets including Society of North American Goldsmiths's Jewelry and Metals Survey and Rare Luxury Living.
