= Salmon River Central School District =

School district in New York, United States

Salmon River Central School District is a school district headquartered in Fort Covington (CDP), New York.

Much of the district is in Franklin County. There, it includes the census-designated place of Fort Covington and portions of the CDP of Akwesasne; the district also covers the St. Regis Mohawk Reservation, the United States portion of the Akwesasne territory. The district includes all of the Town of Fort Covington and almost all of the Town of Bombay as well as most of the Town of Westville and a portion of the Town of Bangor.

A portion of the district is in St. Lawrence County. There, it covers additional portions of Akwesasne CDP, and sections of the Town of Brasher.

== History ==
In 1996, there was a protest where Native Americans occupied the St. Regis Mohawk School, which ended after the school district made a settlement with the tribe.

In 2021, superintendent Stanley Harper, along with the superintendent of the LaFayette Central School District, asked Governor of New York Kathy Hochul for state funding to repair elementary schools which have indigenous populations, including the elementary school on the Mohawk Reservation.

In 2024, the district announced plans to build a solar panel set on a 16-acre (6.5 ha) plot of land.

== Governance ==
In 2007, about half of the members of the board of trustees were ethnic Mohawk people living in Akwesasne.

== Schools ==
- Salmon River High School
- Salmon River Middle School
- Salmon River Elementary School
- St. Regis Mohawk School (elementary) - It is located on the reservation property. The State of New York owns the building and provides repairs, while the school district staffs the school and provides operational services.

== See also ==
- Ahkwesahsne Mohawk Board of Education - This agency operates schools in the Canadian side of Ahkwesahsne
