= St. Mary Catholic High School =

Catholic secondary school in Brockville, Ontario, Canada

Location
- 40 Central Avenue; Brockville, Ontario, K6V 1P8; Canada; 44.59973°N 75.69591°W

Information
- School type: "Catholic" high school
- Founded: 1951
- School board: Catholic District School Board of Eastern Ontario
- Superintendent: Brent Bovaird
- Principal: Laura Mackler
- Chaplain: Sean Shallow
- Grades: 7-12
- Enrollment: 595 (2019-2020)
- Language: English
- Area: Brockville
- Colours: Blue and White
- Team name: St. Mary's Crusaders
- Feeder schools: St. John Bosco Catholic School, J.L. Jordon Catholic School, St. Francis Xavier Catholic School, St. Joseph Toledo
- Website: stmarychs.cdsbeo.on.ca

St. Mary Catholic High School Brockville is a Catholic high school in Brockville, Ontario. The school's current principal is Laura Mackler. The school has a gymnasium, library, large guidance and special education departments, three science classrooms, four English classrooms, a construction lab, music room and a stage/drama room. St. Mary also features a "cafitorium" (auditorium that is transformed into a cafeteria)

== See also ==
- Catholic District School Board of Eastern Ontario
