= Marlana Thompson =

First Nations artist

- Born: 1978 (age 47–48); Cornwall, Ontario, Canada
- Style: Haudenosaunee raised beadwork
- Website: ocbymtb.com

Marlana Thompson (born 1978, also Marlana Thompson Baker) is an Akwesasronon, Wolf clan, beadwork artist, regalia maker, and fashion designer. She currently lives in Akwesasne, New York. Her artworks are in public and private collections in North America and Europe, including the Smithsonian American Art Museum, the Adirondack Experience, and a museum in Bonn, Germany. Her artwork bridges her tribal community and the mainstream art world.

== Biography ==
Marlana Thompson (Akwesasne Mohawk, Wolf clan) was born in Cornwall, Ontario, Canada, in 1978. Her family members are artists and include basket makers and quilters.

She currently lives in Akwesasne, New York, with her husband, Wayne Baker, and children. She is married to actor Wayne Baker of the Squamish Nation, Raven clan. She has had a brief cameo on Beyond, an American television series.

== Artwork ==
Thompson creates Haudenosaunee raised beadwork, in which beads are sewn to create three-dimensional designs on velvet or velveteen backing. She is a regalia maker and moccasin maker. She made powwow dance regalia, first for her family, then other dancers began commissioning her to make custom regalia in 1990s. Finally, she became a full-time artist and also creates beaded jewelry.

During the pandemic, she used raised beadwork in facial mask artworks. She also incorporated cultural medicinal plants in her works, including sweetgrass and sage.

== Career ==
Thompson has been beading and sewing since the age of seven. Her work has been featured in fashion shows in Toronto (Sky Dome Powwow); Akwesasne (Akwesasne International Powwow); and in Long Island, New York.

Thompson runs her own business Okwaho Creations based in Akwesasne. She made moccasins for Manitobah Mukluks Storyboot School, in which Indigenous artists showcased and taught their moccasin-making techniques with Indigenous youth. She also held her own beadwork classes, including a workshop at the Akwesasne Cultural Center.

During the COVID-19 pandemic, she created face masks that reflect her Mohawk Haudenosaunee culture. As for being an artist during the pandemic, she said, "I have reflected most on my family's future during this time. I have had to adjust the way I do my business, how I market and make my sales. My business provides for my family so I had to adapt to the changing times. Covid has also allowed me to see what is important to my family as a whole and help me plan for the future, be it food security or collecting medicines and firewood."

One of her beaded facial masks, Ononkwashon:a / Medicinal Plants won a judge's choice award in Masked Heroes (2020). Another mask in the same series was included in the Smithsonian American Art Museum Renwick Gallery's survey exhibition, This Present Moment: Crafting a Better World (2022–23) in Washington, DC.

== Collections ==
- Smithsonian American Art Museum
- Adirondack Experience

== See also ==
- Victoria Kakuktinniq
