= Lou Bruce =

American baseball player (1877-1968)

- Outfielder
- Born: January 16, 1877; St. Regis, New York, U.S.
- Died: February 9, 1968 (aged 91); Ilion, New York, U.S.
- Batted: Left Threw: Right

MLB debut
- June 22, 1904, for the Philadelphia Athletics

Last MLB appearance
- October 10, 1904, for the Philadelphia Athletics

MLB statistics
- Batting average: .267
- Home runs: 0
- Runs batted in: 8
- Stats at Baseball Reference

Teams
- Philadelphia Athletics (1904)

Louis R. Bruce (January 16, 1877 – February 9, 1968) was an American Major League Baseball outfielder. He played for the Philadelphia Athletics during the 1904 season.

The son of a Mohawk chief from the St. Regis Mohawk Reservation in upstate New York, he attended Central High School in Philadelphia, where he excelled as a student while playing baseball. Discovered by Ed Barrow, he played for the minor league Toronto Maple Leafs from 1900 to 1903, where he was a two-way player, pitching and playing the outfield and finding success in both roles. He also attended the University of Pennsylvania Dental School during those days, and after retiring as a player, earned a degree in theology from Syracuse University.

He was one of the first Native Americans to reach the major leagues, following Chief Sockalexis, Bill Phyle, his teammate Chief Bender and Ed Pinnance.

He was a practicing minister for many years and a promoter of education and citizenship for Native Americans. Bruce helped organize the National Congress of American Indians and advocated for the passage of the Indian Citizenship Act. He married a Sioux woman with whom he had a son, Louis R. Bruce, who served as Commissioner of Indian Affairs.
