= CKON-FM =

Radio station in Akwesasne, Mohawk Nation territory

- Akwesasne; Mohawk nation
- Broadcast area: Cornwall, Ontario
- Frequency: 97.3 MHz
- Branding: 97.3 CKON

Programming
- Format: Adult contemporary Country
- Affiliations: CBS News Radio; WPTZ

Ownership
- Owner: Akwesasne Communication Society

History
- First air date: September 29, 1984
- Call sign meaning: Reference to "sekon", the Mohawk word for "hello".

Technical information
- Licensing authority: Mohawk Nation Council of Chiefs and Clanmothers, Akwesasne Mohawk Nation
- ERP: 10,000 watts (unofficial)
- Transmitter coordinates: 44.9994°N 74.6552°W

Links
- Website: ckonfm.com

CKON-FM (97.3 FM) is a private radio station located in Akwesasne, a Mohawk nation territory that straddles the Canada–United States border; on the Canadian side, it also sits between the interprovincial border between Quebec and Ontario. The station's studios are located in the Akwesasne Communication Society Building; that building is itself on both sides of the international border, with part of it being in Hogansburg, New York, and part of it in Saint Regis, Quebec. The ACS building was deliberately constructed on the international border as a symbol of Mohawk defiance between Canada and the United States, as well as an expression of communal unity.

Its licence was issued by the Mohawk Nation Council of Chiefs and Clanmothers. The station broadcasts on 97.3 MHz and is owned and operated by the Akwesasne Communication Society, a community-based non-profit group.

The call sign CKON is a reference to the Mohawk word "sekon" (or "she:kon"), which means "hello" in English.

While the station uses a call sign that would give the impression of being a licensed Canadian station, according to an article from the Canadian Journal of Communication, it is not, and there is no record of the station being licensed by the Canadian Radio-television and Telecommunications Commission (CRTC), or by the United States Federal Communications Commission (FCC). As such, official technical information about the station is unavailable; however, the station is reported to use 10,000 watts of effective radiated power, and its transmitter site is reported as being located on the Canadian side of the border, in St. Regis (part of the Quebec portion of the reserve). The building CKON is housed in is located on the Canada-United States border. CKON's tower is located on the US portion of the reserve. The station is licensed by a proclamation from the Akwesasne Mohawk Nation given via the Mohawk Nation Council of Chiefs. It is the only radio station in North America operating under the exclusive jurisdiction of an aboriginal government. Its founding board consisted of the following members: Frank David, Brian Cole, Salli Benedict, Lloyd Benedict, Diane Lazore, Doug George-Kanentiio and Francis Boots.

== History ==
The Akwesasne Communications Society was formed in May 1982. The founding members of the ACS were: Diane Lazore, Francis Boots, Salli Benedict, Lloyd Benedict, Doug George-Kanentiio, Frank David and David Brian Cole. After two years of development CKON-FM went on the air on October 1, 1984, from its temporary facility on Cornwall Island. A permanent facility was built in St. Regis in 1988 with part of the broadcasting studios south of the 45th parallel (the border between Canada and the United States) and the administrative offices north of that line.

== Programming ==
CKON-FM has a country music format, but also has adult contemporary music during evenings and oldies on Sundays. CKON-FM also strives to play local and nationwide Native artists. CKON-FM broadcasts in English and Kanien'keha, the language of the Mohawks.

Other programming include an All-Mohawk program hosted by Teddy Peters on featuring native music along with other popular songs of all genre, plus a weekday Mohawk Language Lesson program, after the local news and community announcements.

In addition to music and discussion programming, CKON is also the official broadcaster of Cornwall Colts Junior-league ice hockey. It also airs weather updates provided by Plattsburgh, New York NBC affiliate, WPTZ.
