= You Are on Indian Land =

- Directed by: Mike Kanentakeron Mitchell
- Produced by: George C. Stoney
- Cinematography: Tony Ianzelo
- Edited by: Kathleen Shannon; Noel Starblanket
- Production company: National Film Board of Canada
- Release date: 1969
- Running time: 37 minutes
- Country: Canada
- Budget: $8,432

You Are on Indian Land is a 1969 documentary film directed by Mike Kanentakeron Mitchell about the 1969 Akwesasne border crossing dispute. He covered the confrontation between police and Mohawk of the St. Regis Reservation on a bridge between Canada and the United States, which stands on Mohawk land near Cornwall, Ontario.

By blocking traffic from the bridge, the Mohawk sought to call attention to their grievance that they were prohibited by Canadian authorities from duty-free passage of personal purchases across the border. They claimed this right as part of their right of free passage across the border, as established by the 1794 Jay Treaty between Great Britain and the United States after the latter gained independence in the American Revolutionary War. The film portrayed the rising activism of the Mohawk and demands for self-determination, which has continued.

== Production ==
You Are on Indian Land was produced by the National Film Board of Canada (NFB) as part of its Challenge for Change series, with Mitchell a member of the fledgling Indian Film Crew for First Nations filmmaking. Knowing that negotiations were faltering and that Mohawk here planning to block the bridge, Mitchell asked George C. Stoney, the executive producer of Challenge for Change, for an NFB film crew. Stoney moved quickly to pull a film team together. Director Mort Ransen agreed to work on the project after learning that no First Nations directors were available, saying that he would assist Mitchell.

For Mitchell, who later became a long-serving Grand Chief of Akwesasne, the experience of making You Are on Indian Land blurred the lines between filmmaking and politics:

I was filming the meetings, but I was also asking questions and giving my own views, and I soon became identified as one of the spokesmen [for the community]; they asked that I be part of the delegation that was going to Ottawa. So I was really playing both sides at the time.

== Crediting changes ==
In 2016, an encounter between Mort Ransen and NFB English Program executive director Michelle van Beusekom at the DOXA Documentary Film Festival led to series of discussions about credits for this film. These resulted in the NFB officially recrediting the film with Mitchell as director, in accordance with Ransen's longtime wishes. Additionally, Indian Film Crew member Noel Starblanket was credited as assistant editor for his work alongside editor Kathleen Shannon, the future founder of Studio D.

Regarding the crediting issue, Mitchell said:

I didn't really think one way or another about it because, technically, I was a student. My feeling was, they [the NFB] are calling the shots. So I'm just glad we got the film made. ... Mort [Ransen], who had his name attached as the director, always said that it was not his film, that it was mine. I really think that it was his saying that, for years, that helped them make this decision now.

== Aftermath ==
Afterward, Mitchell worked with the NFB for several more years before leaving filmmaking. He was elected to the Mohawk Council of Akwesasne in 1982. Two years later, he was first elected as its Grand Chief—an office he would repeatedly hold, beginning in 1984 until his reelection in 2012.

== Works cited ==
- Evans, Gary (1991). In the National Interest: A Chronicle of the National Film Board of Canada from 1949 to 1989. University of Toronto Press. ISBN 0802027849.
