= Akwesasne Freedom School =

School in St. Regis Mohawk Reservation, New York, US

Coordinates: 44°59′16″N 74°42′49″W

The Akwesasne Freedom School (AFS) was founded in 1979 in a grass-roots effort by the Mohawk tribe. The Akwesasne Freedom school is located in St. Regis Mohawk Reservation (also known as Hogansburg), New York. It was founded with the intention of strengthening the Mohawk culture which was once in danger of being extinct. The Akwesasne Freedom School is a full-immersion Mohawk school focusing on educating children in the Mohawk language, culture, and customs. The school has survived for over 40 years without any federal or state funding.

== History ==
The Akwesasne Freedom School was established with the intention of creating an education system for the Mohawk people in order to give them the opportunity to prosper in the United States while also retaining their cultural practices and native language.

== Education approach ==
=== Curriculum ===
The Akwesasne Freedom School provides students with the opportunity to learn different subjects such as science, social studies, mathematics and how these subjects are related and important to Mohawk culture. The school focuses on developing students' public speaking skills so that the students can communicate effectively in real world settings. The school begins their day with the Thanksgiving Address, where students recite this at the start of the day. Classes are taught in their native language. The school emphasizes the importance of speaking the Mohawk language in order to keep the Mohawk culture alive. In 1999, AFS students studied and restored wetlands on campus, and were awarded the President's Environmental Youth Award.

=== Physical education ===
The Akwesasne Freedom School hosts the Akwesasne Freedom School (AFS) Survival Race every year. This race challenges students to do different physical activities. The school currently does not have a gymnasium but is working towards collecting funds in order to create a gymnasium.

== Mohawk philosophy ==
The Akwesasne Freedom School focuses on teaching students the importance of the Mohawk and Quaker beliefs of the creation of the world. This is because Mohawks believe that it is their responsibility to take care and preserve the health of their land for generations to come. Akwesasne Freedom School teaches students the importance of preservation in order to prevent the extinction of any creation.

== Demographics ==
The Akwesasne Freedom School provides education to children between kindergarten and 8th grade. The grades are not based on age, but rather on speaking ability of the Mohawk language, so it is possible to have an adult in a “2nd grade” class because they have a 2nd grade speaking level of the Mohawk language. The student to teacher class ratio in the Akwesasne Freedom School is about 11:1. The classes are small in order to better engage with the students and improve their cultural awareness and language skills. There are currently about 61 students enrolled at the Akwesasne Freedom School. There is no equivalent immersion high school on the reservation, therefore students must leave the reservation to attend high school.

== Finances ==
The Akwesasne Freedom School does not accept funds from the US and Canadian government. The Akwesasne Freedom School is a non-profit organization and receives its funding from fundraisers, donations, and student’s tuition administered by The Friends of the Akwesasne Freedom School (FOAFS).
