= Ahkwesahsne Mohawk Board of Education =

Aboriginal school board in Canada

Ahkwesãhsne Mohawk Board of Education (AMBE, French: Conseil scolaire mohawk Ahkwesãhsne or Conseil scolaire des Mohawks d’Akwesasne) is an Aboriginal school board with jurisdiction over the Canadian portions of Akwesasne, in Ontario and Quebec.

For high school education, AMBE agrees to pay tuition for high school students to two school districts in Ontario: Upper Canada District School Board (UCDSB), with AMBE-tuition-paid students going to Cornwall Collegiate and Vocational School and some other UCSDB programs, and Catholic District School Board of Eastern Ontario (CDSBEO), with AMBE-tuition-paid students going to St Joseph's Secondary School and some other CDSBEO programs. UCDSB categorizes Cornwall Island to be in the district's Ward 11.

== History ==
Prior to 1987, the Department of Indian and Northern Affairs Canada (INAC) controlled K–12 education on the Canadian side. The Ahkwesasne Mohawk Board of Education, established by the MCA two years prior, gained operations of those schools from the department in 1987. A movement among Ahkwesasne parents in the early 1980s led to a movement to establish local control of Ahkwesasne schools.

Efforts for an AMBE-UCDSB tuition agreement began circa 1999. They signed an agreement in 2003.

In 2003, some students went to General Vanier Intermediate School and St. Lawrence Intermediate School, and there were also some students who attended high school in the United States.

== Governance ==
In 2007 INAC gave the school system the jurisdiction over education, and it financed the school system. In 2017 INAC was divided into two new agencies.

AMBE is governed by a board of trustees with nine members, with three each from one district within the AMBE jurisdiction. George Fulford wrote in 2007 that "In many respects, AMBE functions like an Ontario municipal school board."

AMBE is a separate organization from the Mohawk Council of Akwesasne. In 2007 Fulford wrote that that "the relationship between MCA and AMBE has remained cordial, respectful and mutually supportive."

== Schools ==
Schools include:

- Ahkwesahsne Mohawk School – K–4, K–5, grades 1–8 (Akwesasne 59, Cornwall Island, Ontario)
- Kana:takon School (French: École Kana :takon) – K–4, K–5, grades 1–5 (Akwesasne Reserve No. 15, Quebec)
- Tsi Snaihne School (French: École Tsi Snaihne) – K–4, K–5, grades 1–8 (Akwesasne Reserve No. 15, Quebec)

== See also ==
Ahkwesahsne education:

- Salmon River Central School District - Operates a public school on the American side of Ahkwesahsne

Indigenous school boards in Quebec:

- Cree School Board
- Kativik Ilisarniliriniq (school board for Nunavik)

Lists:

- List of school districts in Ontario
- List of school districts in Quebec
