= Association of Football Statisticians =

Football statistical organisation

Association of Football Statisticians (AFS)
- Available in: English
- Website: 11v11.com
- Launched: 1979; 47 years ago
- Current status: Active

The Association of Football Statisticians (AFS) is an organisation which collates the historical and statistical records for domestic and international association football. It operates the website 11v11.com. The AFS was founded in 1979. It has published all-time world ranking lists which are not based on subjective opinion or polls, but on an objective data-driven computed assessments according to career achievements.

== History ==
The organisation is located in London. In the beginning, the AFS published a monthly newsletter under the name The Football Experts. This soon grew into a full-fledged magazine, which was published four times a year. Currently, the AFS is working on the Football Genome Project, a project that aims to bring together all match and player statistics since the inception of professional football. In addition, an extensive photo collection is also being worked on aiming at covering the entire football, while the AFS regularly publishes articles and lists based on statistical research. The publication of the World Ranking lists started in 2007.

== Lists ==
=== Top-100 (2007) ===
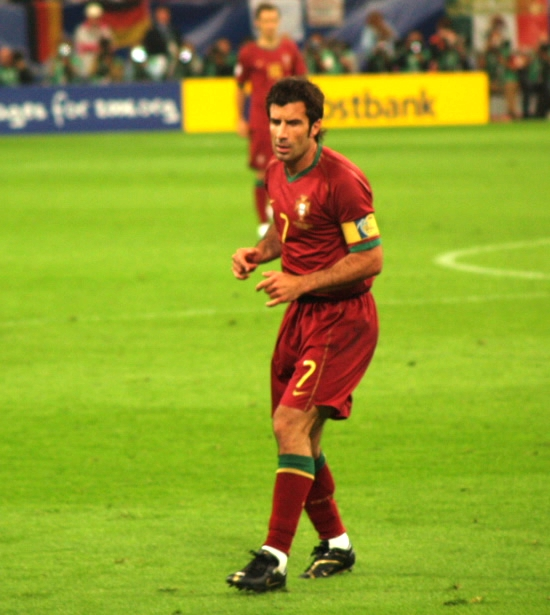
Figo finished fourth in the 2007 all-time ranking.

In November 2007, AFS announced the Top100 players of all time, with the players receiving points according to goals scored (for midfielders and forwards), matches without conceding a goal (for defenders and goalkeepers), titles won, matches played as captain. The top 100 players of this ranking are listed below.

Top 20 players
Rank	Player	Nationality
1	Pelé	Brazil
2	Ronaldo	Brazil
3	Romário	Brazil
4	Luís Figo	Portugal
5	Zinedine Zidane	France
6	Diego Maradona	Argentina
7	Lothar Matthaus	Germany
8	Gerd Müller	Germany
9	Franz Beckenbauer	Germany
10	Cafu	Brazil
11	Roberto Carlos	Brazil
12	Marco van Basten	Netherlands
13	Michel Platini	France
14	Rivaldo	Brazil
15	Paolo Maldini	Italy
16	Zico	Brazil
17	Raúl González	Spain
18	Ruud Gullit	Netherlands
19	Eusébio	Portugal
20	Ferenc Puskas	Hungary

=== Top-50 (2017) ===
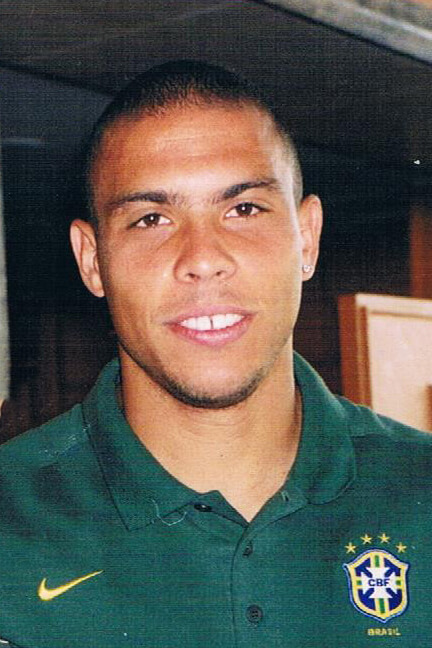
Ronaldo is the best player of all time according to the 2014-2017 AFS list

The Top-50 list was first published in August 2014 as a Top-100, but it is officially presented as the 2017 edition.

In the original 2014 edition the nation with the most players in the top 100 was Germany with 14, followed closely by Spain and the Netherlands with 12 each. France and Brazil both had 11, Italy 9 and England 6. Africa had 3 players, CONCACAF 2 and Asia one.

Top 20 players
Rank	Player	Nationality
1	Ronaldo	Brazil
2	Pelé	Brazil
3	Cafu	Brazil
4	Zinedine Zidane	France
5	Lionel Messi	Argentina
6	Lothar Matthaus	Germany
7	Roberto Carlos	Brazil
8	Xavi	Spain
9	Romario	Brazil
10	Franz Beckenbauer	Germany
11	Luis Figo	Portugal
12	Diego Maradona	Argentina
13	Gerd Muller	Germany
14	Paolo Maldini	Italy
15	Iker Casillas	Spain
16	Raúl González	Spain
17	Thierry Henry	France
18	Rivaldo	Brazil
19	Cristiano Ronaldo	Portugal
20	Marco van Basten	Netherlands

== Controversy ==
The AFS rankings rely vastly on career achievements and trophies and not a player's impact, while international appearances are crucial. This is why footballers such as George Best or Eric Cantona did not make the Top100 ranking, as they won few trophies and had undistinguished international careers. The AFS lists emphasise on the achievements of relatively recent players like Pele, Franz Beckenbauer, Lionel Messi and Diego Maradona who remain high on the ranking.

== See also ==
- RSSSF
- IFFHS
