= Iroquois Indian Museum =

Museum in New York, USA

Iroquois Museum
- Established: 1980
- Location: 324 Caverns Rd, Howes Cave, New York, United States
- Coordinates: 42.69159°N 74.40806°W
- Website: www.iroquoismuseum.org

The Iroquois Museum opened in 1981 in the historic homeland of the Mohawk people, one of the original Five Nations of the Haudenosaunee Confederacy.

== About ==
The Iroquois Museum, which opened in its Howes Cave location in 1992, is built in the form of a traditional longhouse, important to Haudenosaunee culture. These were used by extended families for their residences. Some longhouses were reserved for tribal councils and community meetings or ceremonies. Once based in New York, most Haudenosaunee now live on First Nations reserves in Quebec and Ontario, Canada; others live in New York, Wisconsin and Oklahoma.

The museum was built at a cost of $1.3 million. It holds the largest collection of Haudenosaunee art in the United States, and is designed to teach and interpret the culture of the Six Tribes of the Haudenosaunee.

Also located in the museum is the Iroquois Performing Arts Amphitheater, used for music and dance works based on traditional practices related to the Haudenosaunee culture. Ancestors were in their territory for 10,000 years. The museum's exhibits also embrace modern culture, such as one in 2008 that featured Native American baseball players.

=== Partners ===
The Iroquois Museum has partnered with a number of other museums throughout the United States including:

- Mashantucket Pequot Museum
- Mystic Aquarium
- Institute for American Indian Studies
- Heritage Museum & Gardens
- Old Sturbridge Village
- Shinnecock Museum
- Eiteljorg Museum of American Indians & Western Art
