= St. Joseph's Secondary School (Cornwall, Ontario) =

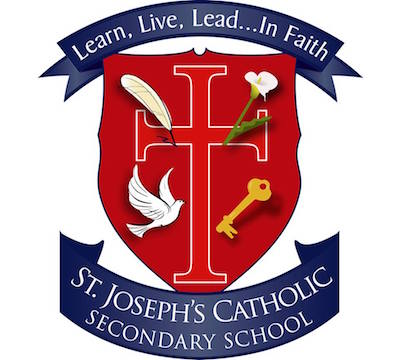

Location
- 1500 A Cumberland St. Cornwall, Ontario, K6J 4K9; Canada; 45.03559°N 74.74980°W

Information
- School type: High school
- Motto: Learn. Live. Lead...In Faith
- Founded: 1983
- School board: CDSBEO
- Principal: Joy Martel
- Grades: 7-12 Core & Immersion.
- Language: English French immersion
- Colours: Red, White and Blue
- Website: sjcss.cdsbeo.on.ca

St. Joseph's Secondary School (SJSS) or St. Joseph's Catholic Secondary School (SJCSS) is a separate (publicly funded Catholic) secondary school in Cornwall, Ontario, Canada. Falling under the jurisdiction of the Catholic District School Board of Eastern Ontario, it shares its building with the newly amalgamated Sacred Heart Catholic School and grade 7-8 wing (where General Vanier Intermediate School was previously housed).

Additionally, Ahkwesahsne Mohawk Board of Education (AMBE), which operates schools on the Canadian portion of Akwesasne, has a tuition agreement to send high school students to this school.

St. Joseph's Feeder Schools are St. Anne Catholic School (Cornwall), Sacred Heart Catholic School (Cornwall), St. Peters Catholic School (Cornwall), and Bishop Macdonell (Cornwall)

== History ==
Bishop Macdonell Catholic Secondary School first opened on September 6, 1983 with fifty-nine students, in grade 9, sharing a building with Bishop Macdonell Senior Elementary School adding a new grade each year. In September 1985, the province authorised the completion to grade 13 of the catholic school system, and the school moved to its present location. With a new class added each year. In September 1987, Grade 13 completed the process of providing the full secondary level of Catholic education in Stormont Dundas and Glengarry. In September 1993, the school was expanded to its current size and layout. In the summer of 2018, the renovation of the closed General Vanier Intermediate School took place to include a separate grade 7-8 wing in St. Joseph due to area elementary schools switching to a K-6 program or being consolidated.

== Academics ==
St. Joseph's offers courses in accordance with Ontario's secondary school curriculum. Being a Catholic school, religion courses are mandatory in grades 9-12. However, according to the Ontario Education Act R.S.O. 1990, CHAPTER E.2 43 (13). Students may be exempt from religion course, provided the parents notify the school in writing.

The Ontario Superior Court has ruled that student at a Catholic high school who is entitled to be excused from religious courses must also be excused, if they wish, from religious field trips and attending mass.

In addition, Specialist High Skill Majors (SHSM) are offered in Automotive, Business and Hospitality to provide students with certifications.

== Athletics ==
St. Joseph's offers a full co-curricular athletic programme. Each year, a full slate of teams compete against other independent schools in the Eastern Ontario Secondary Schools Athletic Association (EOSSAA). St. Joseph's competitive sports teams are known as the "Panthers".
