= Catholic District School Board of Eastern Ontario =

School board in Ontario, Canada

Catholic District School Board of Eastern Ontario CDSBEO

Location
- Kemptville, Ontario Eastern Ontario counties: Lanark, Leeds and Grenville, Stormont, Dundas, Glengarry, Prescott and Russell. Canada
- Coordinates: 45°01′27″N 75°39′07″W

District information
- Chair of the board: Todd Lalonde
- Director of education: Shelley Montgomery
- Schools: 39: 28 elementary, 10 secondary and 1 adult education
- Budget: CA$130 million million (2005-06)

Students and staff
- Students: 13,000 (approx)

Other information
- Elected trustees: 7: T. Lalonde, R.Eamer, J.Cooney, B.Laton, K McAllister, R.Reil, S.Wilson
- Website: www.cdsbeo.on.ca

The Catholic District School Board of Eastern Ontario administers Catholic education for children up to grade 12, in the easternmost counties of Ontario, Canada (an amalgamation of Lanark, Leeds and Grenville, Prescott and Russell, Stormont, Dundas and Glengarry) including the cities of Brockville, Clarence-Rockland, Carleton Place and Cornwall. There are elections for Trustees held periodically.

Additionally, Ahkwesahsne Mohawk Board of Education (AMBE), which operates schools on the Canadian portion of Akwesasne, has a tuition agreement to send high school students to this district.

== Schools ==
It has 28 elementary schools and the following ten high schools:

School name	Community
Holy Trinity Catholic Secondary School	Cornwall
Notre Dame Catholic High School	Carleton Place
St. Francis Xavier Catholic High School	Hammond
St. John Catholic High School	Perth
St. Joseph's Catholic Secondary School	Cornwall
St. Luke Catholic High School	Smiths Falls
St. Mary Catholic High School	Brockville
St. Matthew Catholic Learning Centre	Cornwall
St. Michael Catholic High School	Kemptville
St. Thomas Aquinas Catholic High School	Russell

== See also ==
- Upper Canada District School Board
- List of school districts in Ontario
- List of high schools in Ontario
