= Cornwall Collegiate and Vocational School =

Canadian high school

Location
- 437 Sydney St. Cornwall, Ontario; Canada; 45.02271°N 74.72810°W

Information
- School type: High school
- Motto: Labor Ipse Voluptas (lat. Work itself is a Pleasure)
- Founded: 1806; 220 years ago
- School board: Upper Canada District School Board
- Principal: Jana Hart
- Grades: Grades 7 to 12
- Enrollment: 850+
- Language: English, French immersion, Mohawk
- Colours: Red, Black, and Gold
- Mascot: Raiders
- Website: ccvs.ucdsb.on.ca

Cornwall Collegiate and Vocational School (CCVS) is a high school located in Cornwall, Ontario. Upper Canada District School Board operates the school. Additionally, Ahkwesahsne Mohawk Board of Education (AMBE), which operates schools on the Canadian portion of Akwesasne, has a tuition agreement to send high school students to this school.

== History ==
Cornwall Collegiate and Vocational School (CCVS) was founded in 1806 by John Strachan as the Cornwall Grammar School.

The 1944 Cornwall–Massena earthquake destroyed the middle of the building, which was reconstructed. In the mid-1970s, the centre core again underwent major renovations. Additional changes were made during the summer months of 2011 and 2012 to help accommodate the students from General Vanier Intermediate School for the 2011–12 school year.

CJSS-TV personality Don McGowan led the school's drama club c. 1961.

== See also ==
- Education in Ontario
- List of secondary schools in Ontario
