= Hogansburg, New York =

Hamlet in New York, United States

Coordinates: 44°58′26″N 74°39′48″W

Hogansburg (Mohawk: Tekahswen’karó:ros) is a hamlet, in the Town of Bombay, in Franklin County, New York, United States. It lies on NY 37 near the Canadian-US border at the confluence of the St. Regis River with the Saint Lawrence Seaway. Hogansburg borders the St. Regis Mohawk Reservation.

== History ==
Before being named "Hogansburgh", this was the correct original spelling, this hamlet was first known as St. Regis Mills and then in the early 1800s as Gray's Mills. It was named after William Louis Gray, a man who had been made a captive in Washington County and raised by the Mohawk natives in the area. Gray went on to be a highly influential member of the community. Hogansburg is named for Michael Hogan, an Irish ship captain who grew wealthy in the East India trade. Hogan returned to the US in 1805 with his Indian wife; Hogan bought 20,000 acres (81 km^{2}) just north of what became the Adirondack Park, including the Town of Bombay, which was named in honor of his wife's birthplace. His son, William, served as supervisor, and was elected to the New York Assembly in 1822. In 1829 he became a judge of the court of common pleas for Franklin County, and in 1830 he was elected to Congress.

Hogansburg was leased by Michael Hogan from the Mohawk in 1817, as it was part of their St. Regis Mohawk Reservation, with an agreement to provide a ferry across the St. Regis River. In 1818 Hogan oversaw the building of a grist mill as well.

Other mills and dams were built, including one in 1929 on the St. Regis River near here to generate hydroelectric power. It blocked the passage of migratory fish such as salmon and walleye, destroying the fisheries on which the Mohawk had depended for staple food. The owner finally found it uneconomical to continue to operate, and the Mohawk dismantled the dam in 2016, freeing more than 250 miles of river to the passage of fish again.
