= St. Regis Mohawk Reservation =

Indian reservation in New York, US

Coordinates: 44.973972°N 74.663590°W

St. Regis Mohawk Tribe Ahkwesáhsne (Mohawk) Akwesasne
- Representative democracy
- Country: St. Regis Reservation
- Website: srmt-nsn.gov

Legislative branch
- Legislature: Tribal Council
- Chief: Ross L. Garrow (2025)
- Chief: Michael Karoniatens Conners (2023)
- Chief: Donald Thompson Jr. (2024)

Judicial branch
- Court: Tribal court, court of appeals, peacemaker court

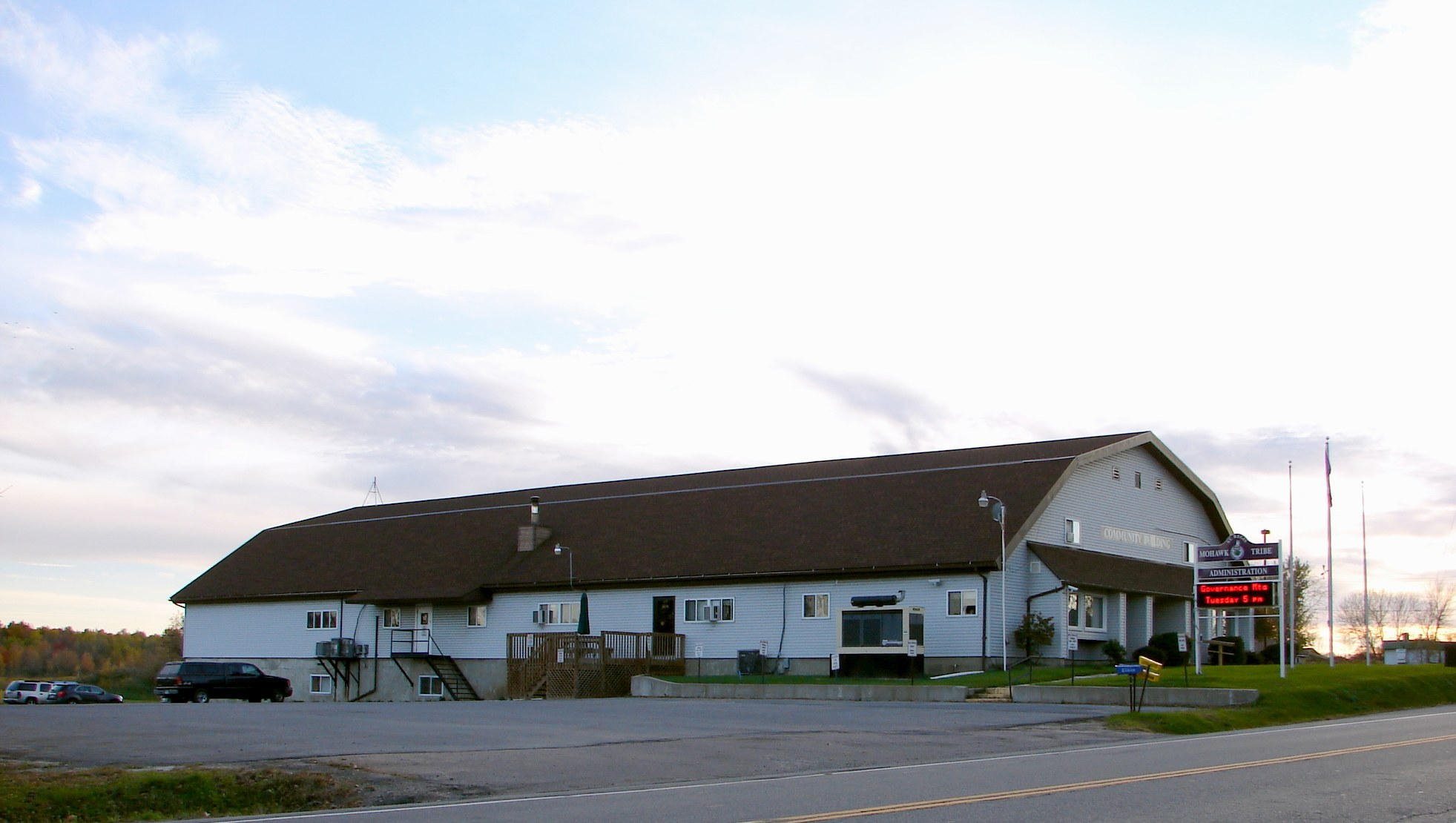
Administration and community building of St. Regis Mohawk Reservation

St. Regis Mohawk Reservation (French: Réserve Mohawk Saint-Régis; Mohawk: Ahkwesáhsne) is a Mohawk Indian reservation of the federally recognized Saint Regis Mohawk Tribe located within Franklin County, New York, United States. The reservation and tribe are components of a larger trans-border Mohawk community known as Akwesasne, which includes the adjacent Akwesasne reserve in Ontario (Akwesasne 59) and Quebec (Akwesasne 15) across the St. Lawrence River. The Mohawk consider the entire community to be one unit and have the right to travel freely across the international border. The population within the United States was 3,288 at the 2010 census.

== Location ==
The reservation contains the community of St. Regis and borders the community of Hogansburg in the Town of Bombay. The Mohawk people dispute the Town of Bombay's claim to jurisdiction within the "Bombay Triangle", as these lands are part of the 1796 Treaty with the United States and have never been diminished by the US Congress.

Under the terms of the Jay Treaty (1794), the Mohawk people may pass freely across the Canada–United States border. The two parts of the reservation are separated by the St. Lawrence River and the 45th parallel.

The Mohawk are one of the original Five Nations of the Haudenosaunee Confederacy, historically based south of the Great Lakes and in present-day New York and Pennsylvania. This nation was located primarily in the Mohawk Valley west of what developed as Albany and were known as the "Keepers of the Eastern Door". They were prepared to defend the Haudenosaunee territory against other tribes located to the east of the Hudson River.

The St. Regis Reservation, and the Saint Regis Mohawk Tribal government, adopted gambling in the 1980s. It has generated deep controversy. Broadly speaking, the elected chiefs and the Mohawk Warrior Society have supported gambling, while some traditional leaders have opposed it. Today, the reservation is home to the Akwesasne Mohawk Casino, which has generated revenues for tribal welfare.

The elected tribal governments on the New York and Canadian sides and the traditional chiefs of Akwesasne often work together as a "Tri-Council" concerning areas of shared interest, for example to negotiate land claims settlements with their respective national governments.

The Saint Regis Mohawk Tribe and the Mohawk people view the reservation as a sovereign nation. Under US treaty law, the federal government has jurisdiction over certain crimes on the reservation, but the Mohawk have their own police force for other cases.

== Geography ==
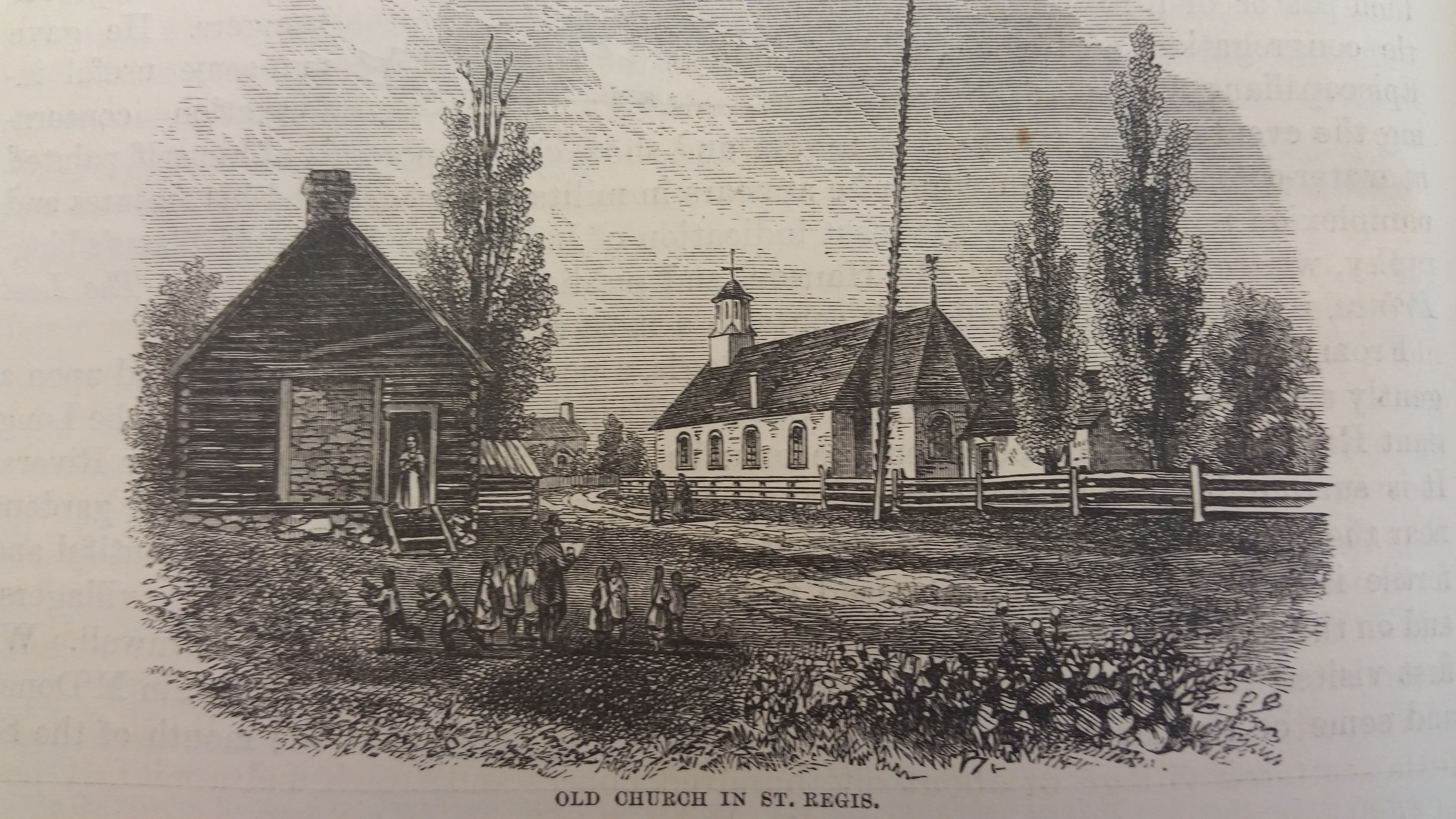
St. Regis

The reservation is at the international border of Canada and the United States along the St. Lawrence River.

According to the United States Census Bureau, the Indian reservation has a total area of 21.0 square miles (54.4 km^{2}). 19.0 square miles (49.1 km^{2}) of it is land, and 2.0 square miles (5.3 km^{2}) of it (9.76%) is water. It is bordered by the New York towns of Fort Covington (east), Bombay (south), Brasher (southwest), and Massena (west), and by the Akwesasne Indian reserve to the north in the Canadian provinces of Quebec and Ontario. The nearest city is Cornwall, Ontario, which lies 6 miles (10 km) to the northwest, across the Akwesasne Reserve.

In August 2021, the St. Regis Mohawk Reservation acquired 41.5 acres in Franklin County, New York.

== History ==
The original settlement was known as Akwesasne, called Saint Régis by French Jesuit missionaries, after Jean François Régis, the priest canonized as a Catholic saint in 1737. He had expressed a desire to be a missionary to the Haudenosaunee.

The settlement was founded about 1755 by several Catholic Haudenosaunee families, primarily Mohawk, who moved upriver from the mission village of Caughnawaga, Quebec (now known as Kahnawà꞉ke), which was south of Montreal. They were seeking better lives for their families, as they were concerned about negative influences of traders at Caughnawaga, who plied the Mohawk with rum. The Mohawk families were accompanied by Jesuit missionaries from Caughnawaga.

After the United States acquired this territory in settlement of its northern border, relations among the people and the varying jurisdictions became more complex. But according to the 1795 Jay Treaty settling the border, the Mohawk retained the right to travel freely across the border in either direction. Since the reservation was established, the Mohawk on both sides of the St. Lawrence River have lost land and been adversely affected by major infrastructure projects conducted by state and federal authorities. These include construction of the St. Lawrence Seaway, what is now known as the Three Nations Crossing bridge, and dams on the rivers for hydroelectric power projects.

Since 1762, mills and dams were built by private, non-Native interests on the St. Regis River at what developed as the village of Hogansburg. It is now within the St. Regis Mohawk Reservation.

In 1929 Erie Boulevard Hydropower built an 11-foot-high dam at the site to generate hydroelectric power. It disrupted the annual salmon fish run from the St. Lawrence, depriving the citizens of the reservation of one of their staple foods. The dam adversely affected the populations of salmon and other migratory fish. By 2010 the dam had become uneconomical. It would have cost too much to upgrade, which would have included current requirements to provide for fish passage in efforts to preserve the species. The owner gave up its federal license.

The Saint Regis Mohawk Tribal government applied to the Federal Energy Regulatory Commission to take over and dismantle the dam, which they did in 2016. Based on restoration of fisheries after such dam removals in other locations across the country, they are optimistic that salmon and other migratory fish, such as walleye, will quickly return to the region. Thus 275 miles of the St. Regis River has been reopened to migratory fish that spend part of their lives in the Atlantic Ocean.

In 2013 the tribe received a $19 million settlement from "GM, Alcoa, and Reynolds for pollution of tribal fishing and hunting grounds along the St. Lawrence River". The companies have undertaken cleanup of the pollution. The tribe intends to use this money to redevelop the former dam site as "the focus of a cultural restoration program that will pair tribal elders with younger members of the tribe to restore the Mohawk language and pass on traditional practices such as fishing, hunting, basket weaving, horticulture and medicine, to name a few."

== Demographics ==
Historical population
Census	Pop.	Note	%±
1900	1,253		—
1910	1,249		−0.3%
1920	1,016		−18.7%
1930	945		−7.0%
1940	1,262		33.5%
1950	1,409		11.6%
1960	1,774		25.9%
1970	1,536		−13.4%
1980	1,802		17.3%
1990	1,978		9.8%
2000	2,699		36.5%
2010	3,228		19.6%
2014 (est.)	3,248		0.6%
U.S. Decennial Census

As of the census of 2000, there were 2,699 people, 904 households, and 668 families residing in the Indian reservation within the US boundary. The population density was 142.2/mi^{2} (54.9/km^{2}). There were 977 housing units at an average density of 51.5/mi^{2} (19.9/km^{2}). The racial makeup of the Indian reservation was 97.41% Native American, 2.07% White, 0.07% from other races, and 0.44% from two or more races. Hispanic or Latino of any race were 0.74% of the population.

There were 904 households, out of which 44.8% had children under the age of 18 living with them, 40.9% were married couples living together, 23.9% had a female householder with no husband present, and 26.0% were non-families. 22.9% of all households were made up of individuals, and 6.4% had someone living alone who was 65 years of age or older. The average household size was 2.97 and the average family size was 3.44.

In the Indian reservation, the population was spread out, with 34.1% under the age of 18, 9.2% from 18 to 24, 30.8% from 25 to 44, 18.1% from 45 to 64, and 7.7% who were 65 years of age or older. The median age was 30 years. For every 100 females, there were 98.6 males. For every 100 females age 18 and over, there were 96.2 males.

The median income for a household in the Indian reservation was $32,664, and the median income for a family was $34,336. Males had a median income of $27,742 versus $21,774 for females. The per capita income for the Indian reservation was $12,017. About 19.4% of families and 22.4% of the population were below the poverty line, including 31.3% of those under age 18 and 14.9% of those age 65 or over.

== Controversies ==
=== Drug and human smuggling ===
Because of the latitude of this area, rivers freeze in winter, providing shortcuts for the Mohawk crossing the international border. These conditions also make the border more porous for smugglers of many items, including liquor, cigarettes, drugs, and people, including human trafficking. The New York Times covered this issue in February 2006 in an article headlined "Drug Traffickers Find Haven in Shadows of Indian Country".

The Akwesasne police and government spokespersons have defended their work, saying they have had to take on an unfair federal burden of border enforcement while not receiving additional funding. Due to a quirk in the law, they were not eligible to receive grants from the federal Department of Homeland Security that were available to local jurisdictions to support the extra work at the border. The chief of the Akwesasne Mohawk police noted that drug smuggling was a problem that extended along the Canada–US border and was not limited to Akwesasne. In March 2006, the St. Regis Mohawk Reservation was awarded a $263,000 grant from the US Bureau of Indian Affairs Office of Legal Services, in order to "fight drug use, violent crime, and drug and human smuggling."

The FBI said that 300 people were caught illegally passing through the reservation from September 1995 to September 1996.

=== Collection of state sales tax ===
For decades New York state has threatened to collect sales tax from sales of gasoline and cigarettes on Native American reservations but has not done so. The legislature often passes such a resolution but the federally recognized tribe says that it has sovereign authority on its reservation and does not need to collect the state tax.

New York residents often fail to report their applicable use taxes; this has become a problem both here and at areas surrounding other Indian reservations across New York. Merchants near the reservations complain that the tax-free sales constitute an unfair advantage for Native American–owned businesses. The Mohawk frequently respond that this is their only advantage, as they have suffered from centuries of discrimination and being dispossessed of their land.

While the government officials argue, a Zogby poll commissioned in 2006 by the Seneca Nation of New York, who are also Haudenosaunee and allies of the Mohawk, showed that 79% of New York residents did not think sales taxes should be collected from reservation sales.

== Education ==
Salmon River Central School District covers the whole St. Regis Mohawk Reservation. The district has one school on the reservation:

- St. Regis Mohawk School - Pre-K to grade 6 - It is located on the reservation property. The State of New York owns the building and provides repairs, while the school district staffs the school and provides operational services.

The zoned secondary schools of the Salmon River district are Salmon River Middle School and Salmon River High School.

== In popular culture ==
- The reservation is the setting for the movie Frozen River (2008). It depicts smuggling of undocumented immigrants by Mohawk and associated Americans across the Canada–US border. The film was shot in Plattsburgh, New York.
- The reservation was the setting for the first, original Tom Swift children's book series (1910–1941).
- The tribe was featured in Season 2, Episode 5 of the CBS drama FBI: Most Wanted, where a racist militia takes up arms against the tribe to defend the US border.

== Patent income ==
In 2017, the tribe entered into an agreement with Allergan Plc, under which Allergan transferred intellectual property rights to the drug Restasis to the tribe in an attempt to shield those patent rights from legal challenges. Allergan will pay the tribe $13.75 million, plus $15 million a year in annual revenues. On February 23, 2018, the U.S. Patent and Trademark Office deemed the Restasis patents invalid and rejected the St Regis Tribe's ability to use sovereign immunity to protect the Restasis patents. Following the announcement, both Allergan and the St. Regis Mohawk Tribe appealed the ruling.

== See also ==
- You Are on Indian Land (1969), a documentary about a 1968 protest by the St. Regis Mohawk and Akwesasne over control of their land.
