= Port Huron–Sarnia Border Crossing =

Canada–United States border crossing

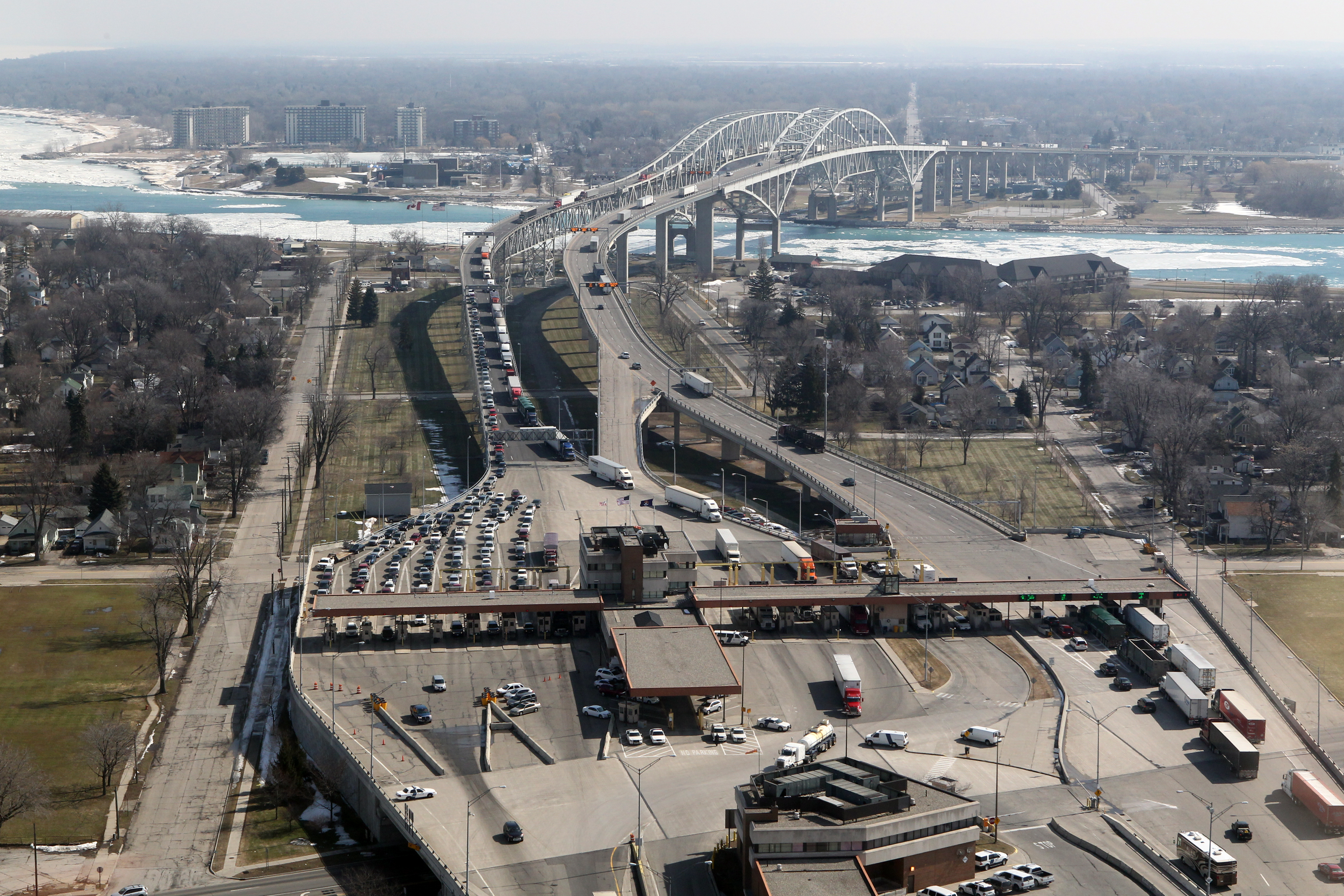
- U.S. Border Inspection Station at the foot of the Blue Water Bridge

Location
- Country: United States; Canada
- Location: I-69 / I-94 / Highway 402 / Blue Water Bridge; US Port: 2321 Pine Grove Ave, Port Huron, MI 48060; Canadian Port: 1555 Venetian Blvd, Point Edward, Ontario N7T 0A9
- Coordinates: 42.998700°N 82.42347°W

Details
- Opened: 1836

Website
- https://www.cbp.gov/contact/ports/port-huron

The Port Huron–Sarnia Border Crossing connects the cities of Port Huron, Michigan and Sarnia, Ontario. It is located at the Blue Water Bridge at the St. Clair River.

Both the US and Canada border stations are open 24 hours per day. The US Customs and Border Protection upgraded its inspection facilities in 2011, and Canada Border Services Agency upgraded its facilities in 2012. In 2017, inspectors at Port Huron processed 1,579,646 cars and 826,288 trucks.

== History ==
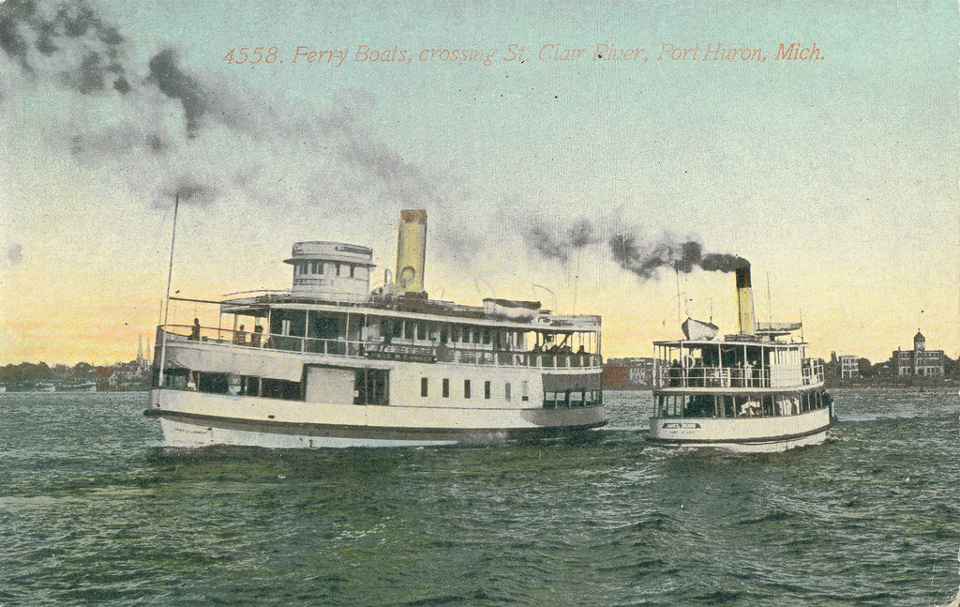
Ferries of the Sarnia and Port Huron Ferry Company Ltd., as seen in 1912

The US Port of Entry was established in 1836, when a license to provide commercial ferry service between Port Huron and what then was known as Port Sarnia. The license was issued to a Canadian man named Crampton who operated a sailboat. In the 1840s, a man named Davenport, also from Port Sarnia, operated a pony-powered vessel. Steam-powered vessels and paddle-wheelers soon followed, but the first vessel capable of carrying automobiles didn't arrive until 1921.

In the 1860s, the Grand Trunk Railway built a chain ferry to take train cars carrying immigrants and cargo across the border. The chain over the river posed problems, and at one point the ferry collided with a steamboat and drifted downstream some ways before being rescued. In August 1872 it was replaced with a train ferry, the International. In 1891, the St. Clair Tunnel was completed, allowing trains to cross the border underground. It was electrified in 1907.

Most immigrants who entered Port Huron in the 19th century continued their trip to the Midwest through a train depot where Thomas Edison sold newspapers as a child. This depot, which was also famous for confidence tricks during Edison's childhood, has been since been reconstructed as Thomas Edison Depot Museum.

The Blue Water Bridge was completed in October, 1938, and the ferry operations ceased less than a year later. New passenger-only ferry service ran from 1946 to 1957. A second, parallel span of the bridge was completed in 1997.

== Border control and records ==
Prior to 1893, Port Huron was essentially an open border. While products were inspected and taxed, there was no control on the flow of people, and in fact in February 1886 the Department of the Treasury ordered the Bureau of Customs to cease even local attempts to count the number of immigrants. In 1893, the US Immigration Service began inspecting Port Huron-bound European immigrants in Montreal, but there was no confirmation done at the ferry ports on the St. Clair River. The United States Border Patrol was established in 1924, providing firmer immigration control, but Canadian citizens were not considered immigrants until 1965 and did not need a visa to cross the border for an indefinite stay. Record keeping and hygiene screening began around 1902.

Border control is currently managed at tollbooths on either side of the Blue Water Bridge, while international ferry service has been discontinued.

== See also ==
- List of Canada–United States border crossings
- St. Clair Tunnel, a railroad tunnel between Port Huron and Sarnia
