= Carnegie Center (Port Huron Museum) =

Building in Port Huron, Michigan

Coordinates: 42.97220°N 82.42655°W

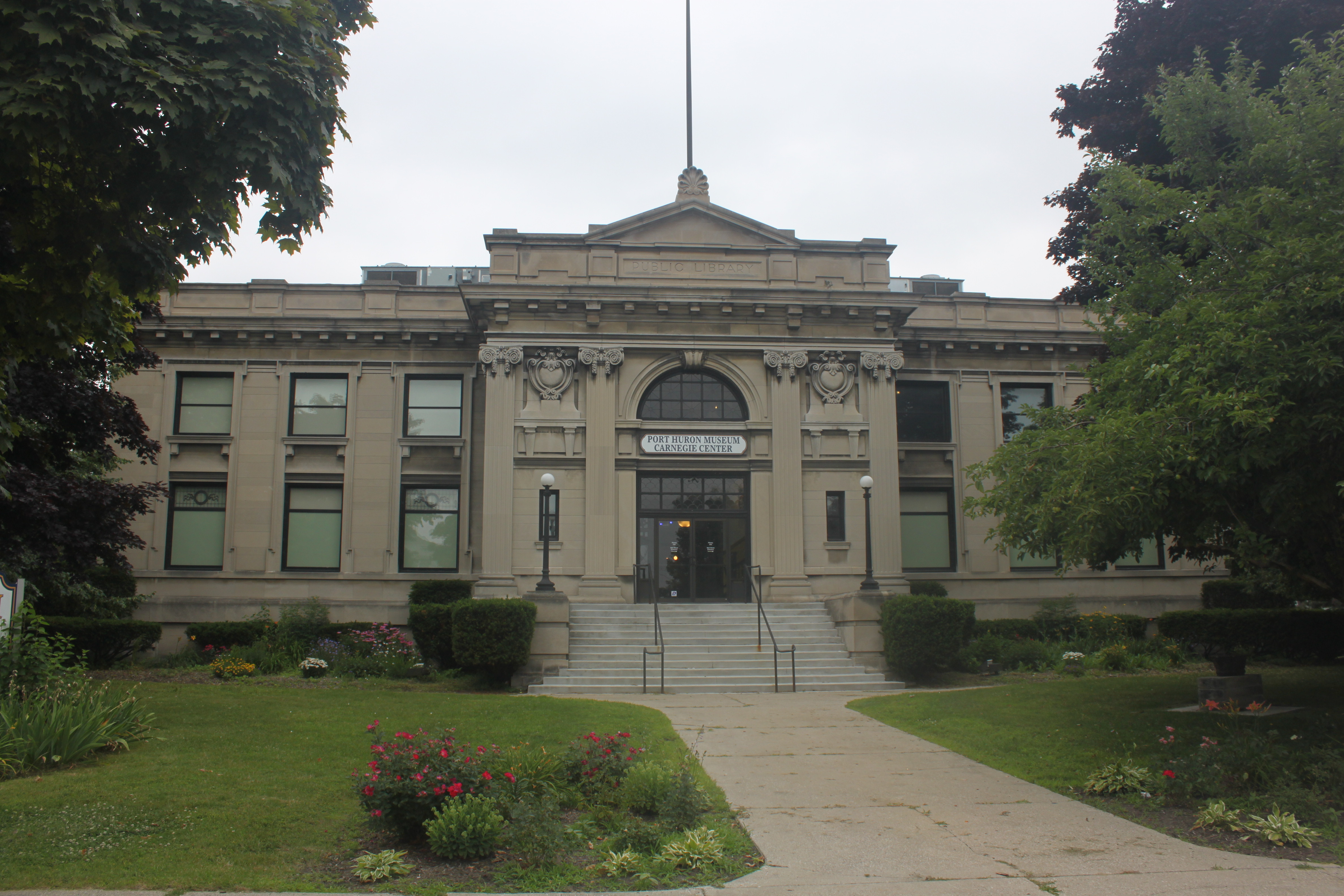
Carnegie Museum

The Carnegie Museum is the main building in the Port Huron Museums museum system in Port Huron, Michigan. The building was financed by a $40,000 donation from Pittsburgh philanthropist and steel entrepreneur Andrew Carnegie.

It opened as the Port Huron Public Library on May 26, 1904. The keynote address was delivered by Melvil Dewey, State Librarian of New York, and creator of the Dewey Decimal System.

In 1967, the Port Huron Public Library was moved and reconstituted as the St. Clair County, Michigan Library System. The new and larger structure is located at 210 McMorran Boulevard.

Thereafter, the original building became the cornerstone of the museum.

The Port Huron Museums are a series of five elements, namely:

- Carnegie Museum — Port Huron Museums
- Huron Lightship
- Thomas Edison Depot Museum
- Fort Gratiot Lighthouse
- Fort Gratiot Post Hospital
