= Nyando =

Nyando may refer to:

- The Nyando River in Kenya
  - The former Nyando District, named after the river
- The New York and Ottawa Railroad (NY and O)
  - Nyando, New York, named after the railroad, and now known as Rooseveltown
