= Fort Gratiot Light =

Lighthouse in Michigan, United States

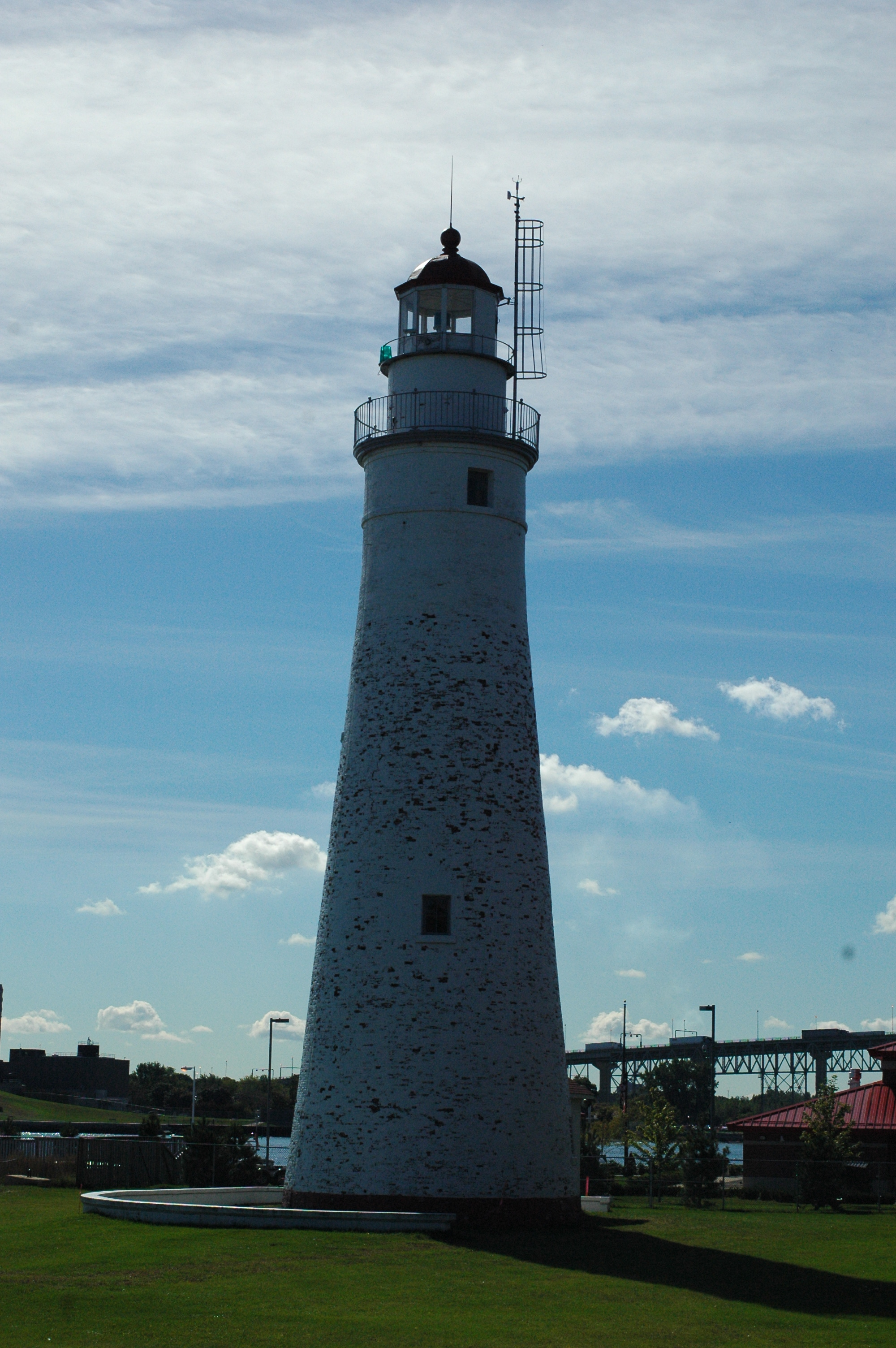
- Location: Omar and Garfield Sts., Port Huron, Michigan
- Coordinates: 43°0′22.7″N 82°25′20.9″W

Tower
- Constructed: 1825
- Foundation: Dressed stone and timber
- Construction: Brick
- Automated: 1933
- Height: 85 feet (26 m)
- Shape: Frustum of a cone attached to workroom
- Markings: White
- Heritage: National Register of Historic Places listed place, Michigan State Historic Site
- Fog signal: Station will give available information on fog conditions in upper river by radiotelephone when requested, (156.80 MHz). Standby light of reduced intensity lighted throughout 24 hours.

Light
- First lit: 1825
- Focal height: 82 feet (25 m)
- Lens: Fourth-order Fresnel lens (original), DCB-224 Carlisle & Finch Aerobeacon (current)
- Range: 18 nautical miles (33 km; 21 mi)
- Characteristic: Fl green 6 seconds
- Fort Gratiot Lighthouse
- U.S. National Register of Historic Places
- Michigan State Historic Site
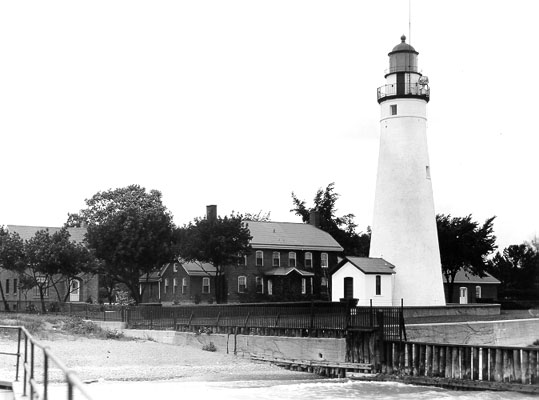
- Undated USCG image
- Area: less than one acre
- Architect: Lyon, Lucius; Moors, J.
- NRHP reference No.: 76001975
- Added to NRHP: July 30, 1976

Fort Gratiot Light /ˈɡræʃɪt/, the first lighthouse in the state of Michigan, was constructed north of Fort Gratiot in 1825 by Lucius Lyon, who later became one of Michigan's first U.S. Senators.

The Fort Gratiot Light marks the entrance to the St. Clair River from Lake Huron (going south) in the southern portion of Michigan's Thumb. The light is still active, but the federal government transferred ownership to St. Clair County Parks and Recreation (St. Clair County PARC) in 2010. In 2012, St. Clair County PARC partnered with the Port Huron Museums to provide tours and lighthouse tower climbs to the public, which continue to be offered on a seasonal basis for a small fee. It is the oldest surviving lighthouse in Michigan. There is also a public beach and park on the property, known as Lighthouse Beach.

It is across the river from Point Edward Front Range Light.

== History ==
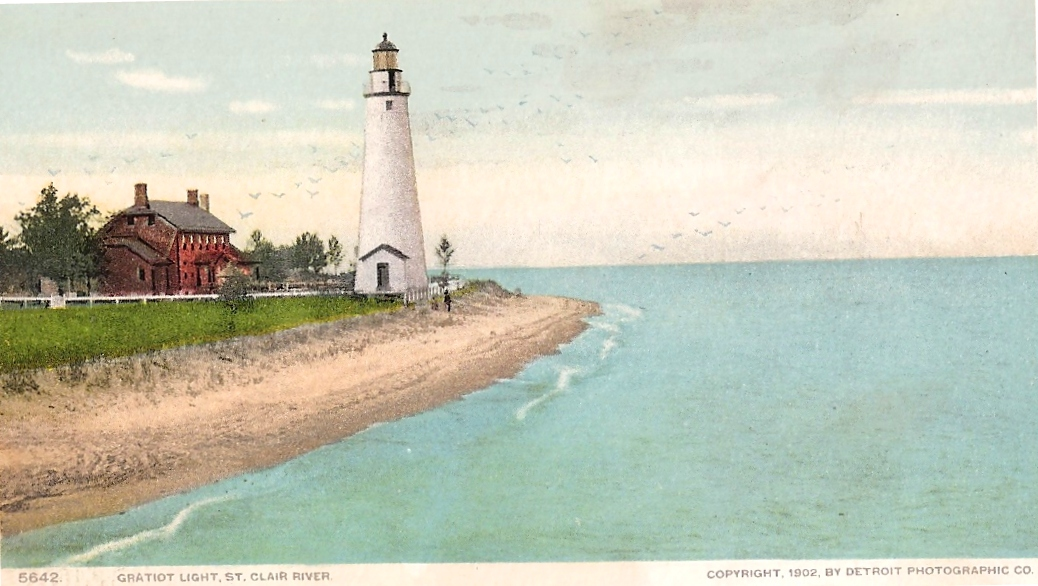
Postcard from around 1902

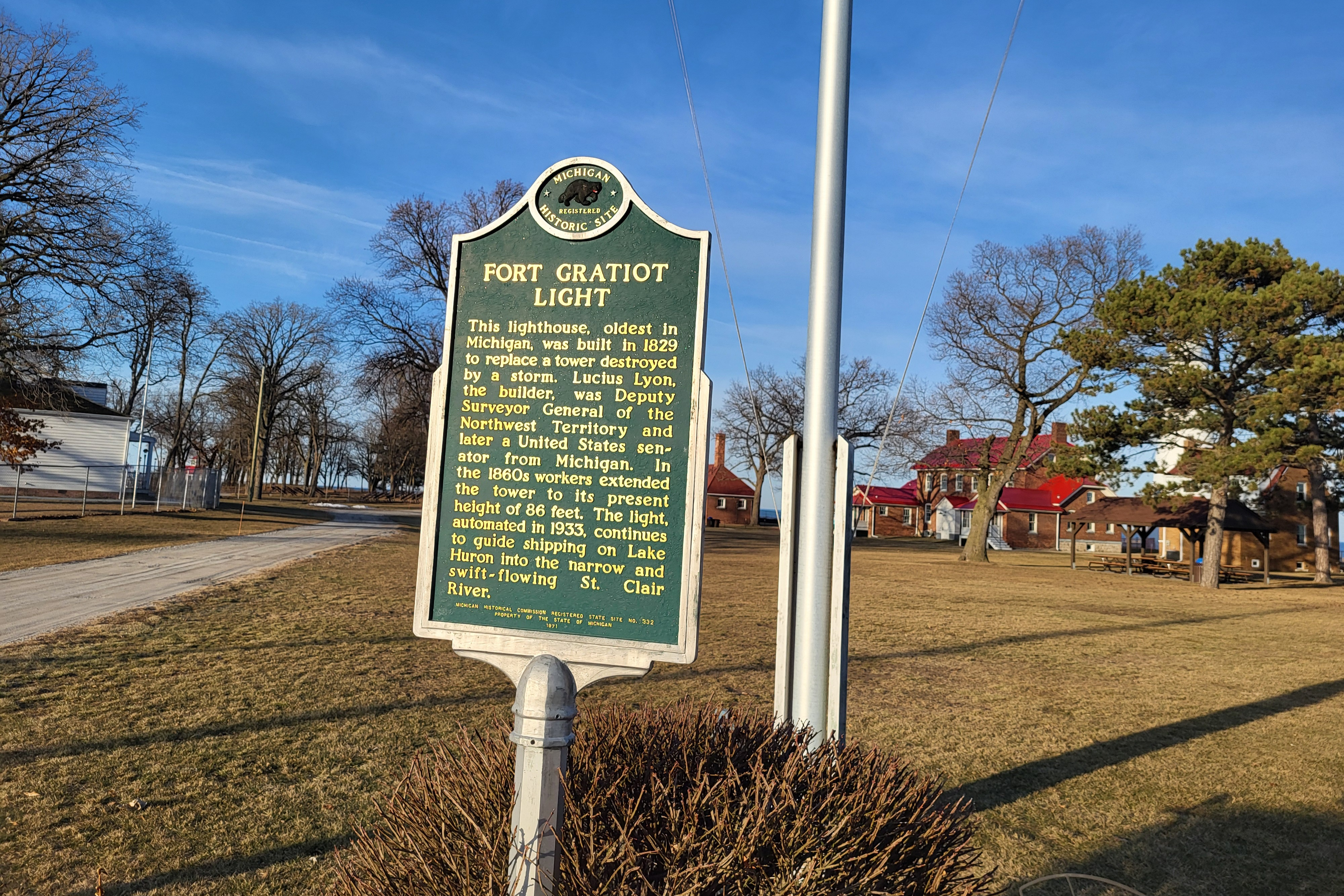
Michigan state historic marker

With the completion of the Erie Canal, traffic in the Great Lakes increased dramatically. Coal was being brought from Michigan, stone (and more timber) was being brought from Wisconsin and the entrance to the St. Clair River became a bottleneck. In 1823, Congress appropriated $3,500 to construct a light in "Michigan Territory" near Fort Gratiot.

The contract for construction of the lighthouse and keeper's dwelling was awarded to Captain Winslow Lewis of Massachusetts. Lewis was the inventor of the patented Lewis lamp, which the Fifth Auditor had universally adopted as the primary source of illumination in the nation's growing inventory of lighthouses. A staunch supporter and ally of the Fifth Auditor, Lewis had branched out into the business of lighthouse construction, and as the frequent low bidder, was being awarded a growing number of contracts to fulfill the nation's need for navigational aids on the East Coast.

Lewis sub-contracted the construction of the tower and keeper's dwelling that would become known as the "Fort Gratiot Light" to Daniel Warren of Rochester, New York. Work commenced on the structure, but appears to have been running far beyond the scope of the original bid, since Congress appropriated an additional $5,000 for the project's completion on April 2, 1825.

This original tower was 32 feet (9.8 m) tall.

Even with the major cost overrun, it became quickly apparent that the structure was both poorly designed and constructed. George McDougall, a former Detroit lawyer of some ill repute was selected as the light's first official keeper. McDougall's reports indicated that the stairs were so steep that they had to be climbed sideways, and the trapdoor into the lantern room was barely large enough for a man to squeeze through. While McDougall no doubt reported with truth on this situation, he was reputedly a short man with a weight in excess of 300 pounds, and as such hired an assistant to perform all of his tower work.

McDougall's concerns were supported when the tower was damaged during a storm in the fall of 1828, and later fell down. Congress reacted swiftly and appropriated $8,000 for a new tower in 1829. The new tower was 65 feet tall and 25' in diameter and it was outfitted with the Lewis lamp system (powered by whale oil) that was then the standard.

Soon after its establishment in 1852, the new US Lighthouse Board determined that the Lewis lamps universally accepted by the prior Pleasonton administration were significantly inferior to the French Fresnel lenses being adopted throughout the rest of the world. After conducting successful trials of the new lenses in a few East Coast lights, the Board decided to upgrade all lenses throughout the system. As a result, the Lewis lamps were removed from Fort Gratiot in 1857, and the tower was refitted with a fourth-order Fresnel lens, which had an intensity at least four times that of the old Lewis lamps.

In 1874, a brick duplex keeper's house was built.

As lake shipping continued to rise dramatically in the early second half of the century, it was determined that the Fort Gratiot Light needed further upgrading. To this end, in 1862 the government increased the height of the tower to 82 feet (25 m), and the fourth-order Fresnel was replaced with a larger third-order lens, showing a fixed white light. The old fourth-order lens was taken to Saginaw and installed in the Saginaw River Lighthouse.

The fog signal building was added in 1900, and a Coast Guard facility was constructed on land south of the lighthouse complex in 1932. The two facilities merged in 1939.

The lighthouse currently has a DCB-224 aero beacon manufactured by the Carlisle & Finch Company.

This lighthouse is the oldest lighthouse in Michigan still in active service.

== Current status ==
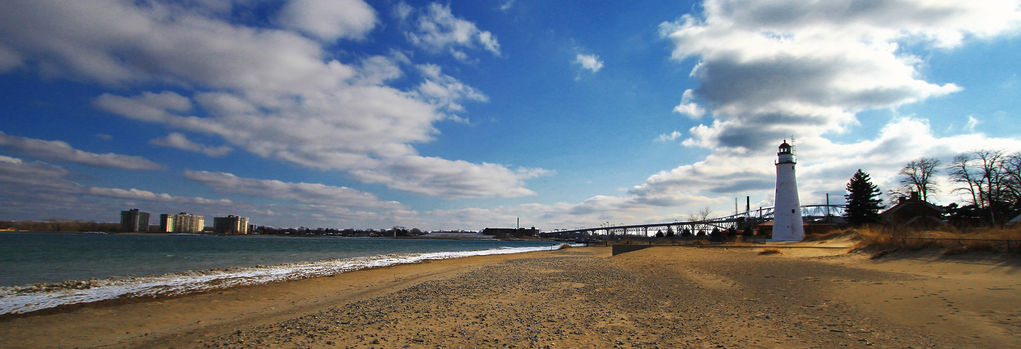
A panorama of Lighthouse Beach. The Fort Gratiot Lighthouse and Blue Water Bridge can be seen.

The light is listed on the National Historic Register, Reference #76001975. In 1971, the Michigan Historical Commission named Fort Gratiot Light a historic site

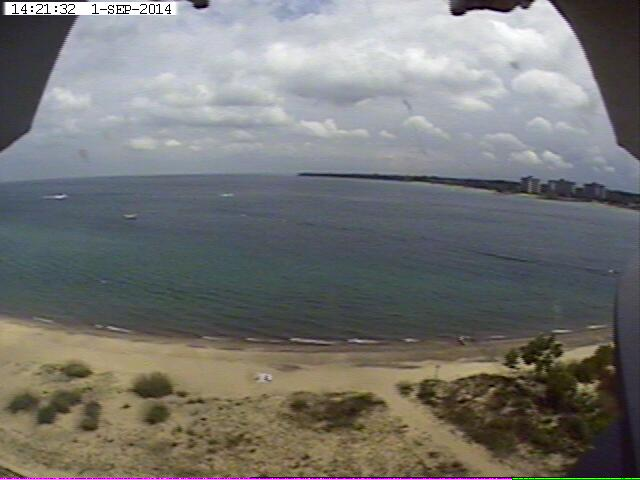
View from the top of the lighthouse.

In 2004, the Port Huron U.S. Coast Guard station moved into a new headquarters adjacent to the light.

The Coast Guard closed the lighthouse to visitors in August 2008 due to deteriorating brickwork and falling debris. A structural assessment and repairs will take place before the tower can reopen to the public. Architects reported that almost $4 million would be required for a complete restoration. In 2009, these plans were jeopardized, when city council rejected a deed offered by the federal government because it found the financial requirements too burdensome. The St. Clair County Parks and Recreation department took over the lighthouse and grounds in September 2010 and reopened guided tours of the lighthouse in summer of 2012.

== Getting there ==
The Park is open daily from 7:00am to 10:00pm. Admission to the park grounds is free. Admission tickets are sold in the gift shop for tours of the station and tower. The park is located at 2800 Omar Street, in Port Huron.

When the grounds are closed to the public, there is a city park just north of the light with an excellent view from the beach. Returning from Canada to Port Huron on the Blue Water Bridge, this light can be seen on the righthand side of one's motor vehicle.

== See also ==
- Point Gratiot Light
