= Three Nations Crossing =

Canada–US border crossing

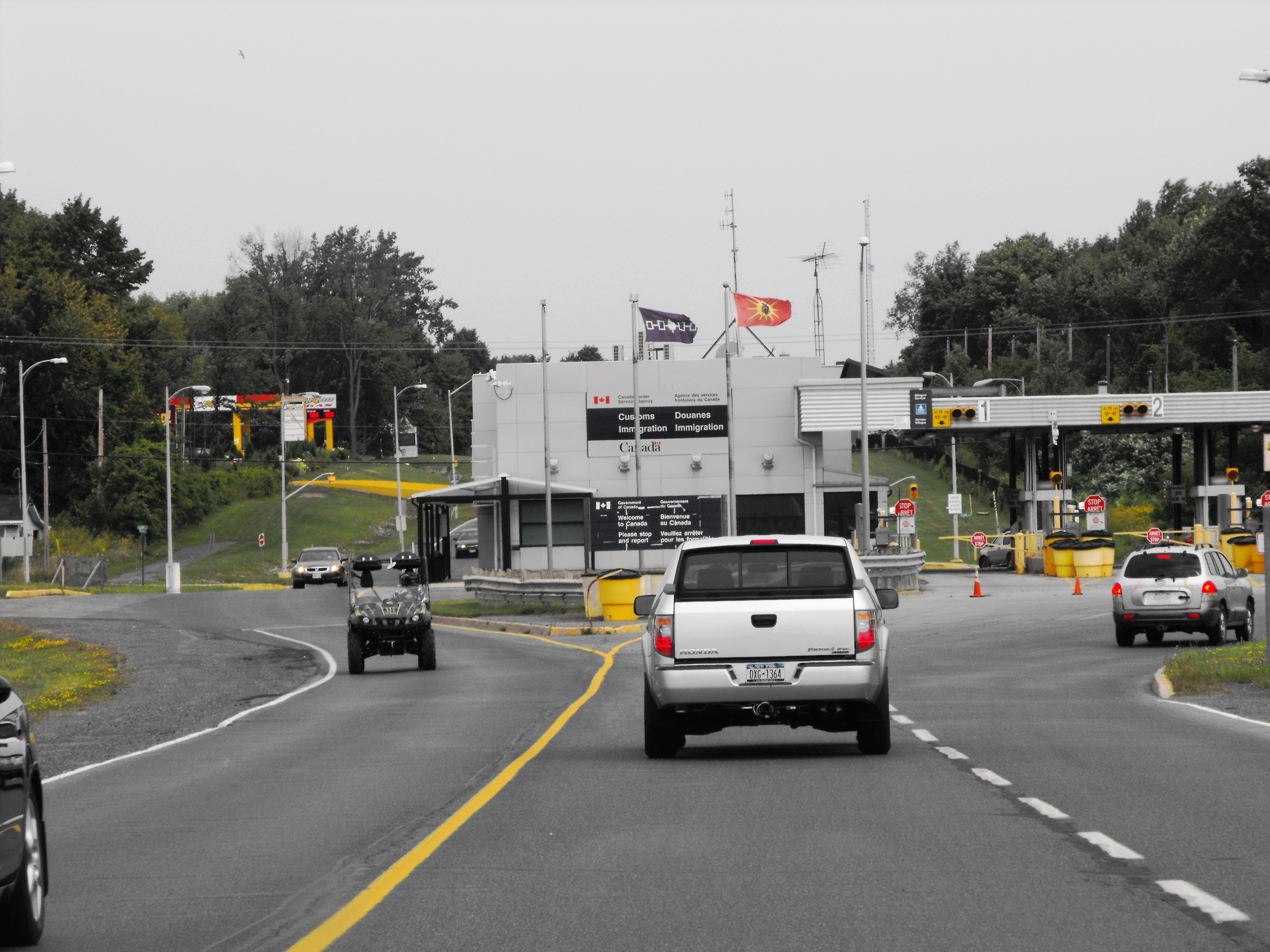
- The former Canadian Border Station on Cornwall Island during the 2009 Akwesasne occupation

Locaiton
- Country: United States; Canada
- Location: Seaway International Bridge, between NY 37 and Brookdale Avenue; US Port: 30M Seaway International Bridge, Rooseveltown, New York 13683; Canadian Port: 755 Brookdale Avenue, Cornwall, Ontario K6J 5C6
- Coordinates: 44.990602°N 74.739561°W

Details
- Opened: 1935

Website
- https://www.cbp.gov/contact/ports/massena

The Three Nations Crossing is a border crossing on the Canada–US border, connecting the city of Cornwall, Ontario in Canada to Massena, New York, in the United States. The crossing is associated with the Seaway International Bridge, which crosses the two channels on each side of Cornwall Island, which is located on the St. Lawrence River. The bridge is 4.7 km (2.9 mi) in length. It is the easternmost border crossing in Ontario.

== History ==
Canada established Cornwall as a port of entry in 1800. Regular ferry service existed between Cornwall and Massena since the late 1800s.

In 1900, the rail bridge of New York and Ottawa Railway was built at Cornwall, the only crossing on the St. Lawrence River between Niagara River and Montreal at this point.

During the 1920s, negotiations with several parties were initiated to find a way of supporting automobile traffic on the Cornwall railway bridge. In 1935 a road bridge was added and both rail and road bridges were commemorated as the Roosevelt International Bridges. The international bridges were replaced in 1958 by the Cornwall-Massena International Bridge, at which time both border stations were also replaced. The north span of the bridge was replaced in 2014.

In 2000, the international border crossing was renamed the Three Nations Crossing, in honor of the Mohawk people of Akwesasne, a federally recognized Mohawk tribe in the United States and Indigenous peoples in Canada. The reservation is situated mostly in the US state of New York, and crosses into the Canadian provinces of Ontario and Quebec.

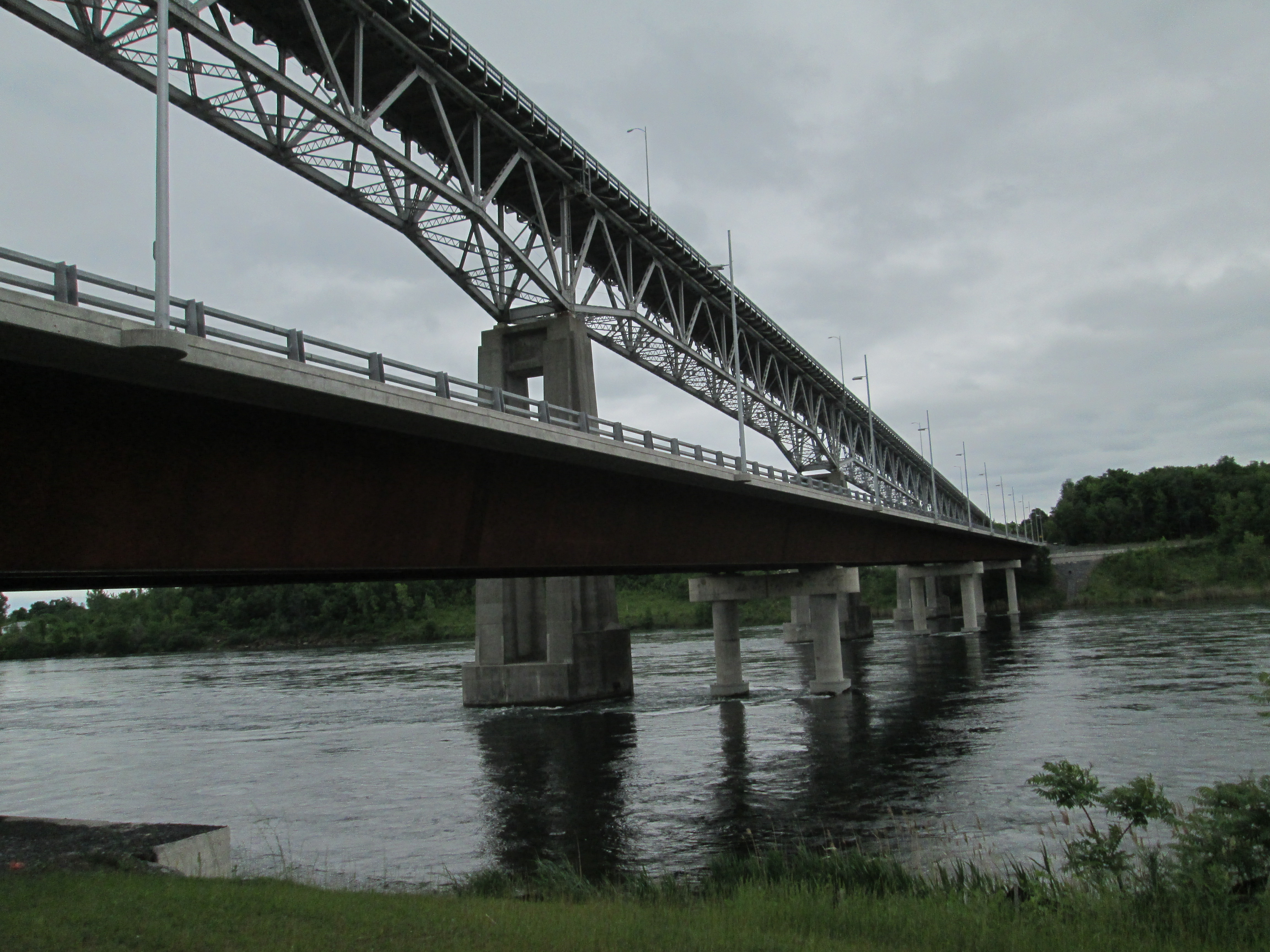
New North Channel Bridge between Cornwall and Akwesasne in Ontario, Canada

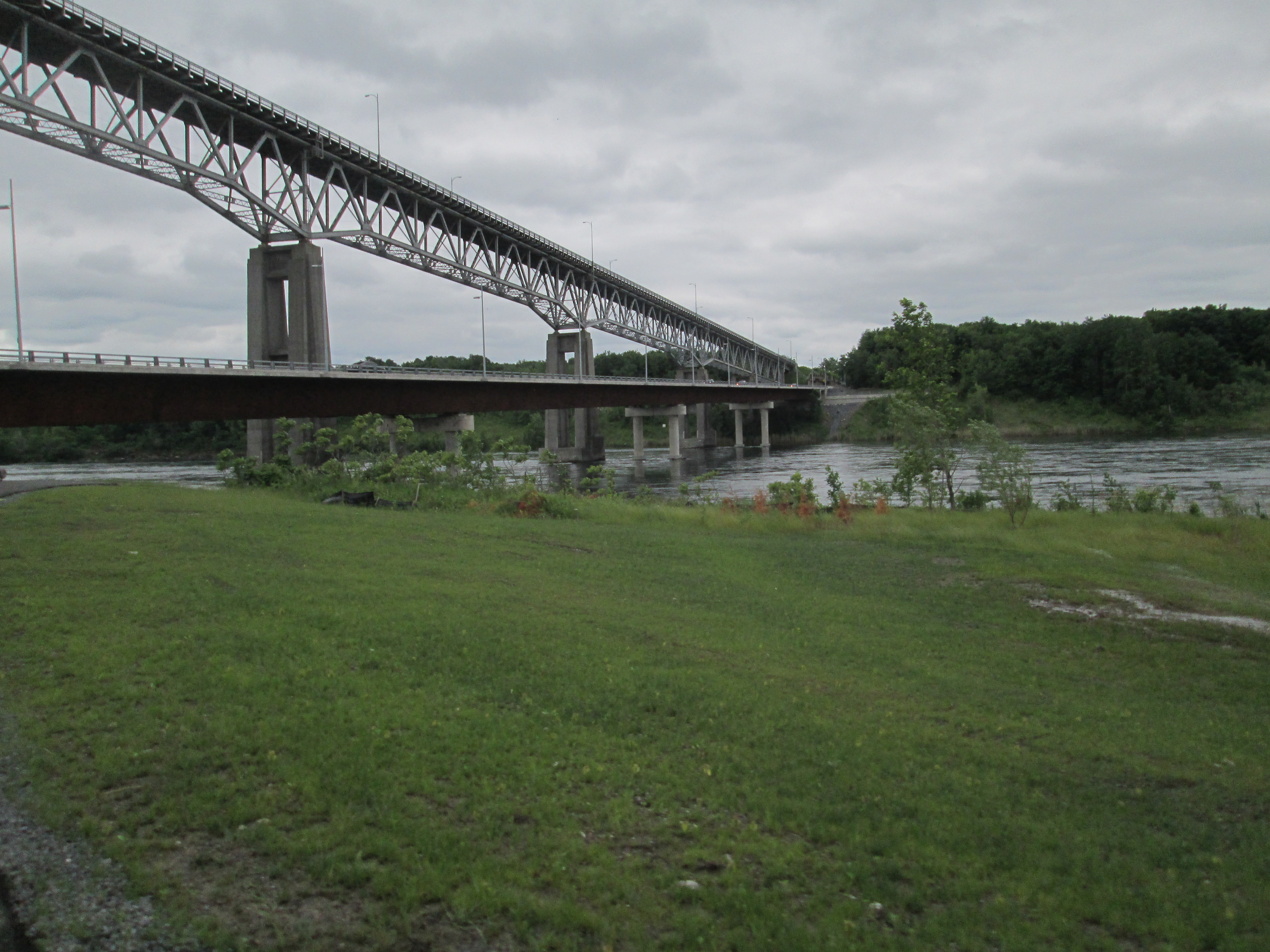
New 2014 bridge between Cornwall and Akwesasne, Ontario, Canada. New bridge is lower bridge. Old bridge is higher bridge. It is scheduled to be removed.

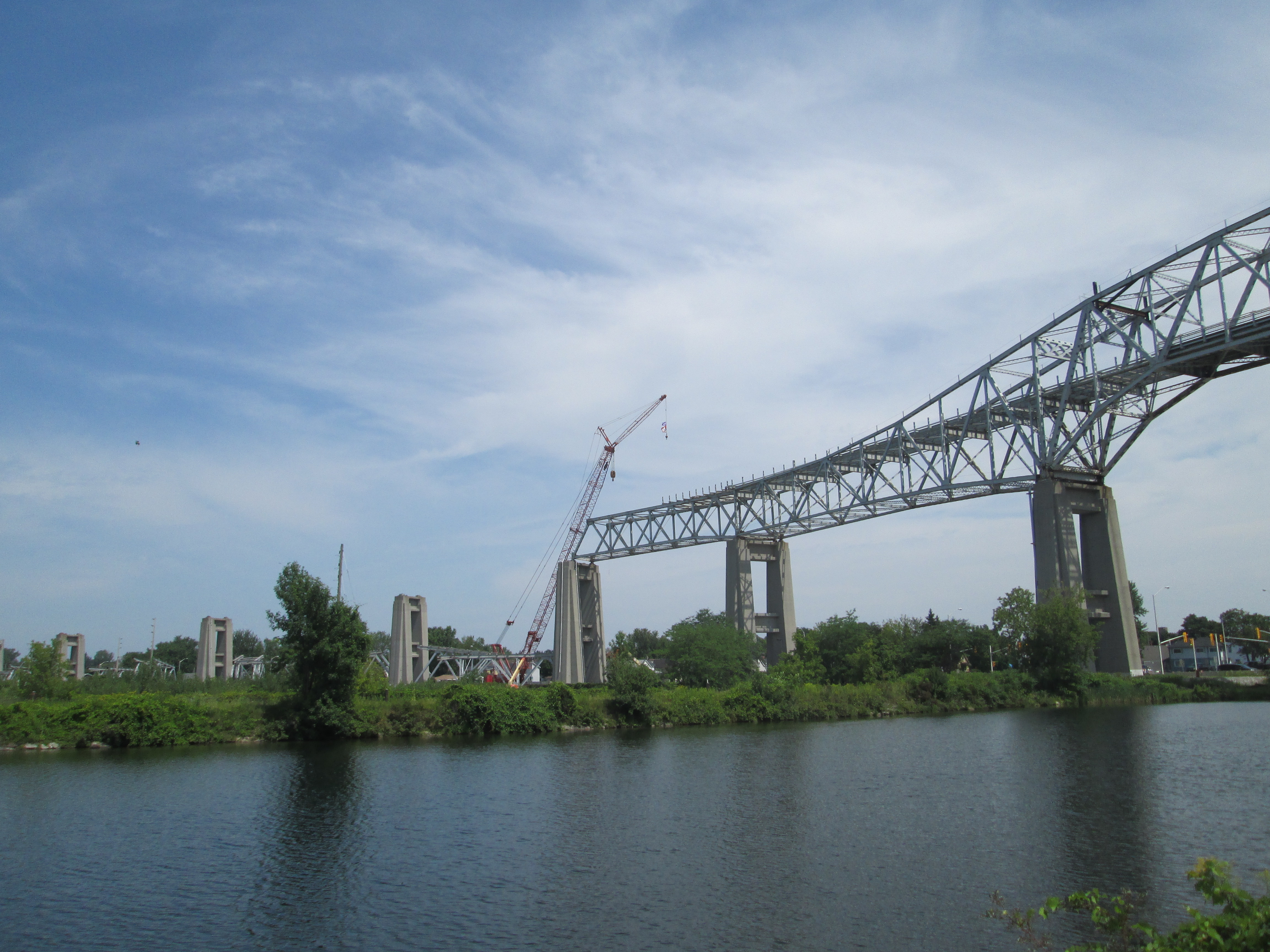
July 2015: Demolition of Seaway International Bridge, which was replaced by the much lower North Channel Bridge

== Controversy ==
In May 2009, the Mohawk people of Akwesasne occupied the area around the Canada Border Services Agency (CBSA) port of entry building to protest the Canadian government's decision to arm its border agents while operating on Mohawk territory. The north span of the Seaway International Bridge and the CBSA inspection facilities were closed. During this occupation, the Canadian flag was replaced with the flag of the Mohawk people. Although US Customs remained opened to southbound traffic, northbound traffic was blocked on the US side by both American and Canadian officials. The Canadian border at this crossing remained closed for six weeks. On July 13, 2009, the CBSA opened a temporary inspection station at the north end of the north span of the bridge in the city of Cornwall, allowing traffic to once again flow in both directions.

The Mohawk people of Akwesasne have staged ongoing protests at this border. In 2014 they objected to a process that made their crossing more tedious; believing it violated their treaty rights of free passage. When traveling from the US to Cornwall Island, they must first cross a second bridge into Canada, for inspection at the new Canadian border station. Discussions between inter-governmental agencies were being pursued on the feasibility of relocating the Canadian border inspection facilities on the US side of the border.

== See also ==
- List of Canada–United States border crossings
- List of crossings of the Saint Lawrence River
- Cornwall Island (Ontario)
