= Federal Bridge Corporation =

Canadian government agency

The Federal Bridge Corporation Limited
- Type: Crown corporation
- Industry: Transportation
- Founded: January 27, 2015
- Headquarters: Ottawa, Ontario, Canada
- Number of locations: 4 bridges (2015)
- Area served: Ontario
- Key people: Pascale Daigneault (Chairperson); Natalie Kinloch (CEO); TBD (Vice-Chair)
- Revenue: CAD$40 million (2016)
- Operating income: CAD$1 million (2016)
- Net income: CAD$5.5 million (2016)
- Total assets: ▲CAD$389 million (2016); CAD$372 million (2015)
- Owner: Government of Canada
- Number of employees: 116 (2022/2023)
- Website: federalbridge.ca

The Federal Bridge Corporation Limited (FBCL; French: La société des ponts fédéraux Limitée) is the name of two successive Canadian federal Crown corporations.

The Federal Bridge Corporation Limited is responsible for operating and managing the following bridges:

- Blue Water Bridge in Point Edward, Ontario
- Seaway International Bridge in Cornwall, Ontario
- Sault Ste. Marie International Bridge in Sault Ste. Marie, Ontario
- Thousand Islands International Bridge in the Thousand Islands

An amalgamated Crown Corporation was formed on February 1, 2015, to operate and manage the bridges operated by the original Federal Bridge Corporation Limited, and the Blue Water Bridge in Point Edward, Ontario (near Sarnia), that had previously been managed under the authority of the Blue Water Bridge Authority.

The company is headquartered in Ottawa, and it reports to the Parliament of Canada through the Minister of Transport.

== Bridges ==
The following bridges are managed by the company, as of November 2016.

Bridge Name	Location	Opened
Blue Water Bridge	Point Edward, Ontario	1938
Sault Ste. Marie International Bridge	Sault Ste. Marie, Ontario	1962
Seaway International Bridge	Cornwall, Ontario	1958
Thousand Islands International Bridge	Lansdowne, Ontario	1937

The American half of the bridge is separately owned and maintained by the Michigan Department of Transportation.

== Awards and recognition ==
=== LEED certification ===
The Blue Water Bridge Corporate Centre in Point Edward, Ontario, was awarded LEED (Leadership in Energy and Environmental Design) certification on June 25, 2015. LEED certification is a distinction awarded by the Canada Green Building Council for the design and operation of high-performance green buildings. The Corporate Centre is a four-story building opened in 2011, as an administrative complex for Blue Water Bridge operations. Its certification plaque is posted in the lobby of the office building in Point Edward.

== History ==
In October 2013, in order to streamline governance of the four separate Crown corporations that owned international crossings, the federal government announced its intention to amalgamate them under a single Crown corporation, the Federal Bridge Corporation Limited. Bill C-4 Section 8 was passed into law December 12, 2013, and was fully in effect as of February 1, 2015.

=== Blue Water Bridge Authority ===
Blue Water Bridge Canada

The Blue Water Bridge Authority was a Canadian Crown corporation responsible for the operation and maintenance of the Canadian side of the Blue Water Bridge. It was established on May 21, 1964 via the Blue Water Bridge Authority Act (Canada), which authorized it to provide highway traffic between Canada and the United States over the Blue Water Bridge. It was granted exclusive rights to levy tolls on westbound traffic from Canada to the United States in order to offset the costs of operation, maintenance, and construction.

On April 26, 2002, the Authority became a Schedule III, Part I parent Crown corporation. It was not required to pay taxes and not eligible to receive appropriations. In September 2007, in accordance with Federal Identity Program requirements, the organization was officially titled Blue Water Bridge Canada.

On February 1, 2015, via House Government Bill C-4 Section 8 (assented to on December 12, 2013), the Blue Water Bridge Authority was amalgamated with St. Mary's River Bridge Company and Federal Bridge Corporation Limited to form the Federal Bridge Corporation Limited, which now owns and maintains the Canadian side of the Blue Water Bridge along with three other international bridges in Canada.

==== Business ====
The main source of revenue for Bridge operations on the Canadian side is the exclusive right, granted by the Canada Transportation Act (1996), to collect tolls from westbound traffic crossing the bridge from Canada into the United States. Toll revenue from eastbound traffic into Canada from the United States is levied by and belongs to the Michigan Department of Transportation. Toll rates are reviewed regularly, and both sides of the Bridge independently vary their rates based on fluctuating traffic conditions, trade agreements between Canada and the United States, foreign exchange rates between the two countries' currencies, and other factors. Other sources of revenue include Duty Free Store sales, currency exchange fees, and interest on cash and investments.

==== Community Integration ====
Approximately 38.5 acres (15.6 ha) of land owned by the Bridge has been identified as archaeologically sensitive according to the Cemeteries Act (Ontario), due to aboriginal burial sites in the area. The land on which the bridge was built was once a hub for the Anishinaabe trade network that spanned the continent, and a place of celebration and ceremony. Today, responsibility for preserving the burial sites is held by the Aamjiwnaang First Nation band in Sarnia, Ontario. Blue Water Bridge Canada and Aamjiwnaang First Nation have historically maintained an excellent working relationship, yielding conflict-free construction of the second bridge span, expanded parking lots, and other on-site development despite taking place on archaeologically sensitive land. Officials from the Bridge and Aamjiwnaang First Nation continue to meet yearly to explore current and future issues of mutual interest.

As a symbol of co-operation and respect between the Blue Water Bridge and the Aamjiwnaang First Nation, a statue was unveiled just south of the bridge on June 21, 2003, hand-carved by Anishinaabe artist and sculptor Dennis Henry-Shawnoo from a single piece of sandstone.
