= Rooseveltown, New York =

Hamlet in New York, United States

Rooseveltown is a hamlet in the town of Massena, New York, United States located in St. Lawrence County. It is near the eastern town line, by the Raquette River.

Rooseveltown was the site of a station on the New York and Ottawa Railway, and was originally known as Nyando (NY and O). It was the former location of the Massena Castings Plant where engine block and cylinder heads were cast for GM engines from 1959 until 2009 when the plant was closed and demolished.

== Map Coordinates ==
- 44°58′22″N 074°43′52″W
- 44.9728277°N 74.7310168°W

== See also ==
- Seaway International Bridge, bridge across the St.Lawrence River to Canada, from Rooseveltown through Akwesasne to Cornwall
- Three Nations Crossing, international border cross occupying the bridge's trace
