= Dorothy Henry =

American cartoonist (1925–2020)

- Dorothy Lee Manning, later Dorothy Henry, from a 1957 newspaper.
- Born: Dorothy Alice Leenknecht; October 31, 1925; Detroit, Michigan
- Died: December 21, 2020 (aged 95)
- Other name: Dorothy Lee Manning (after first marriage)
- Occupations: Cartoonist, illustrator

Dorothy Henry (October 31, 1925 – December 21, 2020), born Dorothy Alice Leenknecht, was an American cartoonist and illustrator. She drew and wrote a newspaper comic strip, Bill and Sue, in London in the 1950s.

== Early life and education ==
Dorothy Leenknecht was born in Detroit, Michigan, the daughter of August Leenknecht and Dorothy Jean Waltham Leenknecht. She graduated from Cass Technical High School in 1943. She studied art at Wayne State University and the Detroit Institute of Arts, and with the Art Students League of New York. She earned an associate degree in art from St. Clair County Community College.

== Career ==
During World War II, Leenknecht was a member of the Civil Air Patrol. While she was a young wife and mother living in London in the 1950s, Dorothy Manning took over drawing and writing an existing comic strip, Bill and Sue, for the Daily Herald.

Back in Michigan, Dorothy Henry was staff illustrator at the Port Huron Times Herald. She was an active member of the Port Huron Hiking Club, the Blue Water Art Club, the Sarnia Rock and Fossil Club, and the Blue Water Lapidary Society. She was president of the board of trustees at the Port Huron Museum. In 1975, she had a one-woman show of her works, including comic strips, commercial illustrations, sketches and paintings, at the Port Huron Museum.

== Personal life ==
Dorothy Leenknecht married twice. Her first husband was Englishman Lawrence Sydney Rayson Manning; they married in 1951, and had two children, Jessie and Robert. Her second husband was electrical engineer Howard Patrick Henry Jr. She died in 2020, aged 95 years.
