= Sarnia Transit =

Public transport provider in Ontario, Canada

- Founded: 1974
- Headquarters: 1169 Michener Road
- Locale: Sarnia, Ontario
- Service area: Sarnia, Point Edward, Brights Grove
- Service type: Bus service, specialised transit
- Routes: 12
- Fleet: 25 buses 6 Care-A-Van vehicles
- Operator: City of Sarnia
- Chief executive: Andrew Savor, director of transit
- Website: Sarnia Transit

Sarnia Transit provides public transportation within the City of Sarnia and the independent village of Point Edward in Ontario, Canada. This includes conventional bus transit, transportation of people with disabilities (Care-A-Van), transportation support for major events and charter services.

== Routes ==
The following services are provided by Sarnia Transit's Monday to Friday Day Schedule:

No.	Name	Daytime	Evening	Saturday	Sunday	Route
1	Confederation	Yes	Yes	Yes	Yes	Downtown to Murphy Road Terminal.
2/11	Devine/George	Yes	No	Yes	No	Downtown to Murphy Road Terminal via Devine Street and returning to Downtown via George Street.
3	Wellington	Yes	Yes	Yes	Yes	Downtown to Murphy Road Terminal, then back to Downtown via Wellington Street. Route combines with 4 Maxwell during weekday midday (945AM-230PM), evenings, and weekends, running from Murphy Road Terminal to Downtown via Wellington Street while combined.
4	Maxwell	Yes	Yes	Yes	Yes	Downtown to Murphy Road Terminal, then back to Downtown via Maxwell Street. Route combines with 3 Wellington during weekday midday (945AM-230PM), evenings, and weekends, running from Downtown to Murphy Road Terminal via Maxwell Street.
5A	Rosedale	Yes	No	Yes	Yes	Northgate Plaza to Murphy Road Terminal via Rosedale Avenue, Michigan Avenue and Rapids Parkway. Dial-a-ride service for Monday through Saturday evenings, starting at 6:30pm.
5B	Rosedale	Yes	No	Yes	Yes	Murphy Road Terminal to Northgate Plaza via Rosedale Avenue, Rapids Parkway and Blackwell. Dial-a-ride service for Monday through Saturday evenings, starting at 6:30pm.
6	Mitton	Yes	No	No	No	Northgate Plaza, Capel St, London Rd, Indian Rd, Confederation St, Ontario St, Mitton St.
7	Cathcart	Yes	No	Yes	Yes	Northgate Plaza to Lakeshore and Murphy via Cathcart Boulevard, connecting to other routes only at Northgate Plaza. Dial-a-ride service for Monday through Saturday evenings, starting at 6:30pm.
8	Sherwood Village	Yes	Yes	Yes	Yes	Murphy Road Terminal, Wellington St, Trudeau Dr., Finch Dr., Lambton College, Lambton Mall.
9	Exmouth	Yes	Yes	Yes	Yes	Services Downtown, Northgate, Murphy Rd Terminal, Progressive Auto Sales Arena, Lambton College, UWO Research Park and Heritage Park.
10	Vidal South	Yes	No	No	No	Downtown to Imperial Oil, LanXess, and Nova Chemicals plants.
12	Point Edward	Yes	No	Yes	No	Services Point Edward from Northgate Terminal.
14	Cardiff	Yes	Yes	Yes	Yes	Murphy Road Terminal, Walmart, YMCA and Cardiff Dr.
15	Bright's Grove	Yes	Yes	Yes	Yes	Murphy Road Terminal to Old Lakeshore and Mandaumin via Lambton Mall, Hiawatha Horse Park, and Bright's Grove Plaza.

== See also ==
- Public transport in Canada
