= Port Huron Museum =

Group of museums in Port Huron, Michigan

Coordinates: 42.97220°N 82.42655°W

The Port Huron Museums are a series of five museums located in Port Huron, Michigan, United States. It includes the Carnegie Museum, Huron Lightship, Thomas Edison Depot Museum, Fort Gratiot Lighthouse, and Fort Gratiot Post Hospital. The museum was founded in 1967.

== See also ==
- Dorothy Henry
