= Point Edward, Ontario =

Point Edward
- Village (lower-tier)
- Village of Point Edward
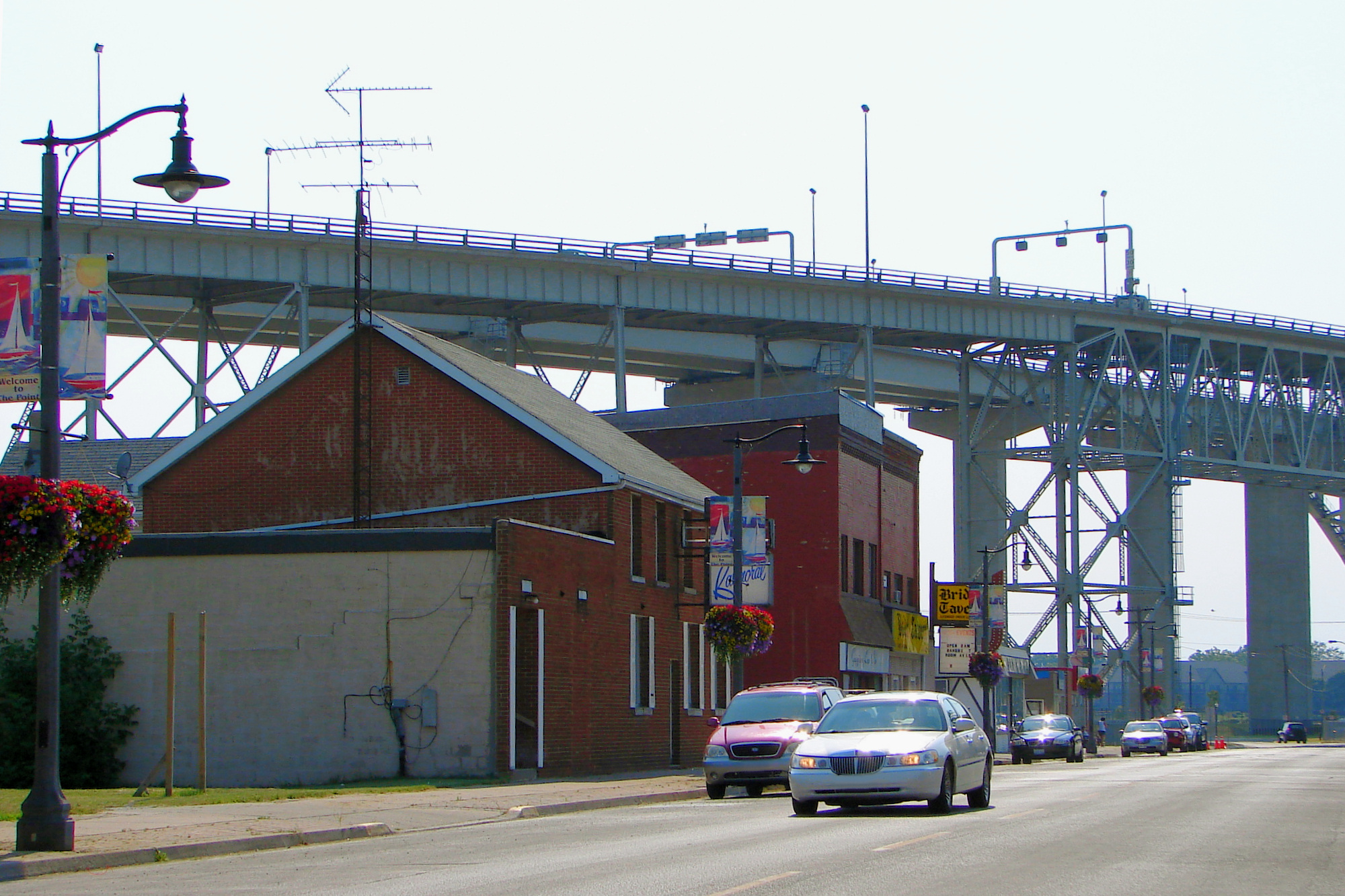
- Michigan Avenue with the Blue Water Bridge in the background
- Motto: Progressively independent since 1878.
- Location within Lambton County Location within Southern Ontario
- Coordinates: 42°59′35″N 82°24′30″W
- Country: Canada
- Province: Ontario
- County: Lambton
- Established: 1878

Government
  - Mayor: Bev Hand
  - MPs: Marilyn Gladu (LPC)
  - MPPs: Bob Bailey (OPC)

Area
  - Land: 3.28 km^{2} (1.27 sq mi)
- Elevation: 178 m (584 ft)

Population (2016)
  - Total: 2,037
  - Density: 620.6/km^{2} (1,607/sq mi)
- Time zone: UTC-5 (Eastern (EST))
  - Summer (DST): UTC-4 (EDT)
- Postal code FSA: N7V
- Area codes: 519 and 226
- Website: www.villageofpointedward.com

Point Edward is a village in the Canadian province of Ontario. Adjacent to the city of Sarnia in Lambton County, Point Edward sits opposite Port Huron, Michigan and is connected to it by the Blue Water Bridge, at the meeting point of the St. Clair River and Lake Huron. Formerly called Huron, it was renamed in 1860 to mark the visit by the then Prince of Wales, later Edward VII. It was incorporated in 1879. In the Canada 2016 Census, the population of Point Edward was 2,037, an increase of 0.1 percent from its 2011 population of 2,034.

In the summer of 2003, Point Edward celebrated its 125th anniversary.

== Municipal government ==
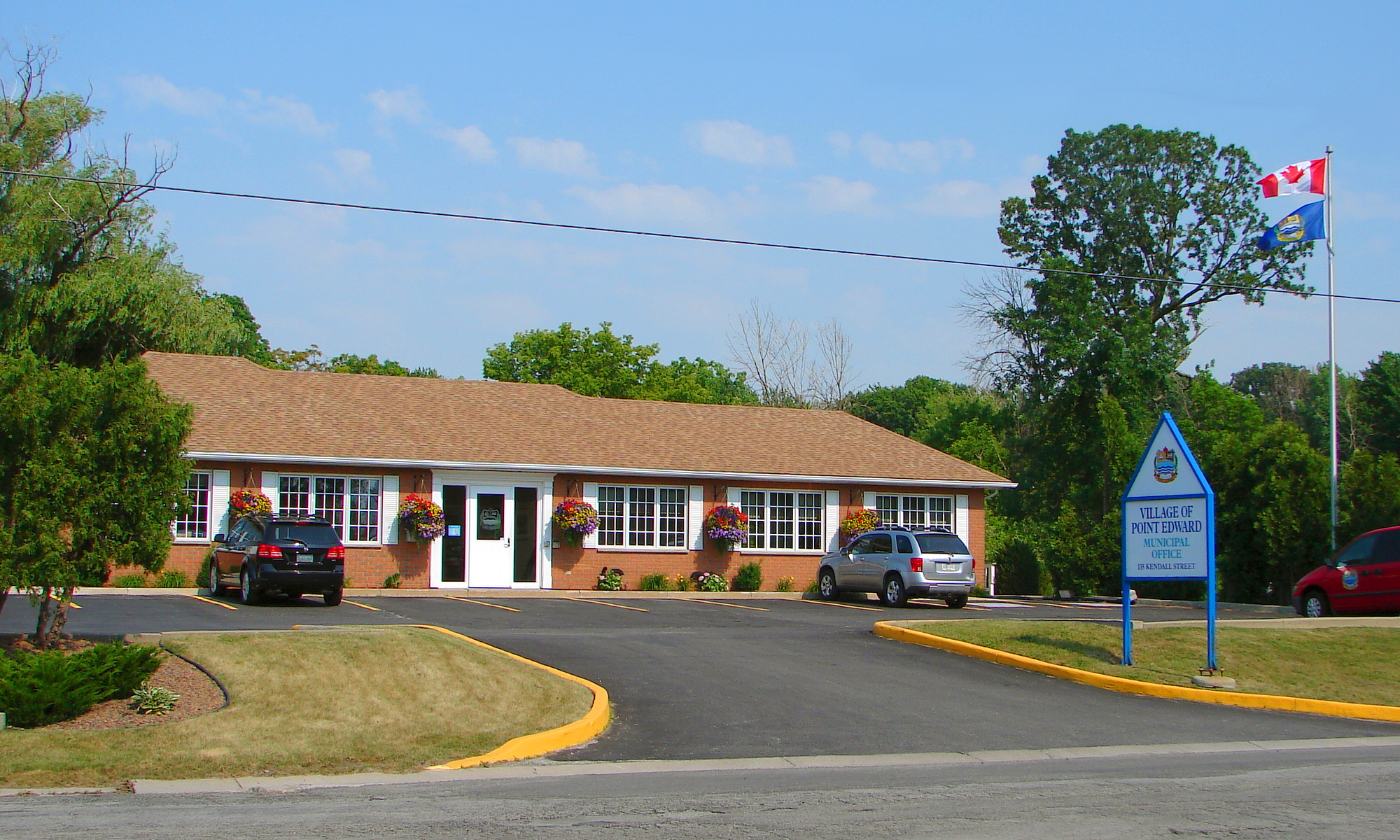
Municipal office

The current mayor of Point Edward is Bev Hand.

In the late 1980s, the provincial government initiated a plan to amalgamate Point Edward with the larger city of Sarnia, although many residents opposed the merger and the plan was abandoned in 1991. Even under the Progressive Conservative Party of Ontario government of Premier Mike Harris, which forced amalgamations of many municipalities in the province (including of many towns which were geographically distinct settlements) in the late 1990s, Point Edward remained untouched. Despite this, some municipal government services in Point Edward are provided on contract by the city of Sarnia. For example, Point Edward is served by both Sarnia Transit and Bluewater Power Distribution, Sarnia's municipally owned hydroelectricity provider.

== Economy ==
Most businesses in Point Edward are independently owned. The only franchises located in the village are hotels and the Gateway Casino Point Edward.

== Arena ==
The Point Edward Arena is a year round facility consisting of an ice rink with an attached recreational hall . It hosts ice hockey and figure skating events in the winter as well as specialized flooring for other sports held in the summer. The facility is open for rent to the public for special events and tournament hosting. The Point Edward Arena is also the home of the Point Edward Blackhawks Minor Hockey Team.

== Schools ==
Point Edward is home to Bridgeview Public School. It was opened in the late 1940s to house the growing number of children in the village. The previous school was located where Optimist Park currently is. Bridgeview houses grades from junior kindergarten to Grade 8. It also has one of the best outfitted classroom facilities for special needs students in Southwestern Ontario. The Lambton Kent District School Board has closed a number of elementary schools due to low capacity, although Bridgeview remains open because of the highly valued special needs facilities.

== Transportation ==
Federal Bridge Corporation operates and maintains the Blue Water Bridge, a twin-span bridge across the Saint Clair River to Michigan, along with its associated customs and immigration facilities. The company has bought and closed several houses along St. Clair and Alexandra Ave. It owns and maintains a great deal of land in Point Edward, but there is little room left for expansion.

== Demographics ==
Historical population
Year	Pop.	±%
1941	1,363	—
1951	1,838	+34.8%
1961	2,744	+49.3%
1991	2,336	−14.9%
1996	2,257	−3.4%
2001	2,101	−6.9%
2006	2,019	−3.9%
2011	2,034	+0.7%
2016	2,037	+0.1%

In the 2021 Census of Population conducted by Statistics Canada, Point Edward had a population of 1,930 living in 938 of its 989 total private dwellings, a change of −5.3% from its 2016 population of 2,037. With a land area of 3.3 km^{2} (1.3 sq mi), it had a population density of 584.8/km^{2} (1,514.8/sq mi) in 2021.

Canada census – Point Edward community profile

	2021	2016	2011
Population	1,930 (-5.3% from 2016)	2037 (0.1% from 2011)	2034 (0.7% from 2006)
Land area	3.30 km^{2} (1.27 sq mi)	3.28 km^{2} (1.27 sq mi)	3.27 km^{2} (1.26 sq mi)
Population density	585/km^{2} (1,520/sq mi)	620.6/km^{2} (1,607/sq mi)	622.8/km^{2} (1,613/sq mi)
Median age	55.2 (M: 54, F: 56.4)	47.7 (M: 46.7, F: 48.6)	50.7 (M: 49.8, F: 51.7)
Private dwellings	940 (total)	960 (total)	1000 (total)
Median household income

References: 2021 2016 2011

Canada 2011 Census		Population	% of Total Population
Visible minority group	South Asian	0	0%
Visible minority group	Chinese	0	0%
Visible minority group	Black	40	2%
Visible minority group	Filipino	0	0%
Visible minority group	Latin American	0	0%
Visible minority group	Arab	0	0%
Visible minority group	Southeast Asian	0	0%
Visible minority group	West Asian	0	0%
Visible minority group	Korean	0	0%
Visible minority group	Japanese	0	0%
Visible minority group	Other visible minority	0	0%
Visible minority group	Mixed visible minority	0	0%
Total visible minority population		40	2%
Aboriginal group	First Nations	40	2%
Aboriginal group	Métis	0	0%
Aboriginal group	Inuit	0	0%
Aboriginal group	Unspecified	5	0.2%
Total Aboriginal population		45	2.2%
White		1,950	95.8%
Total population		2,035	100%

== Parks ==
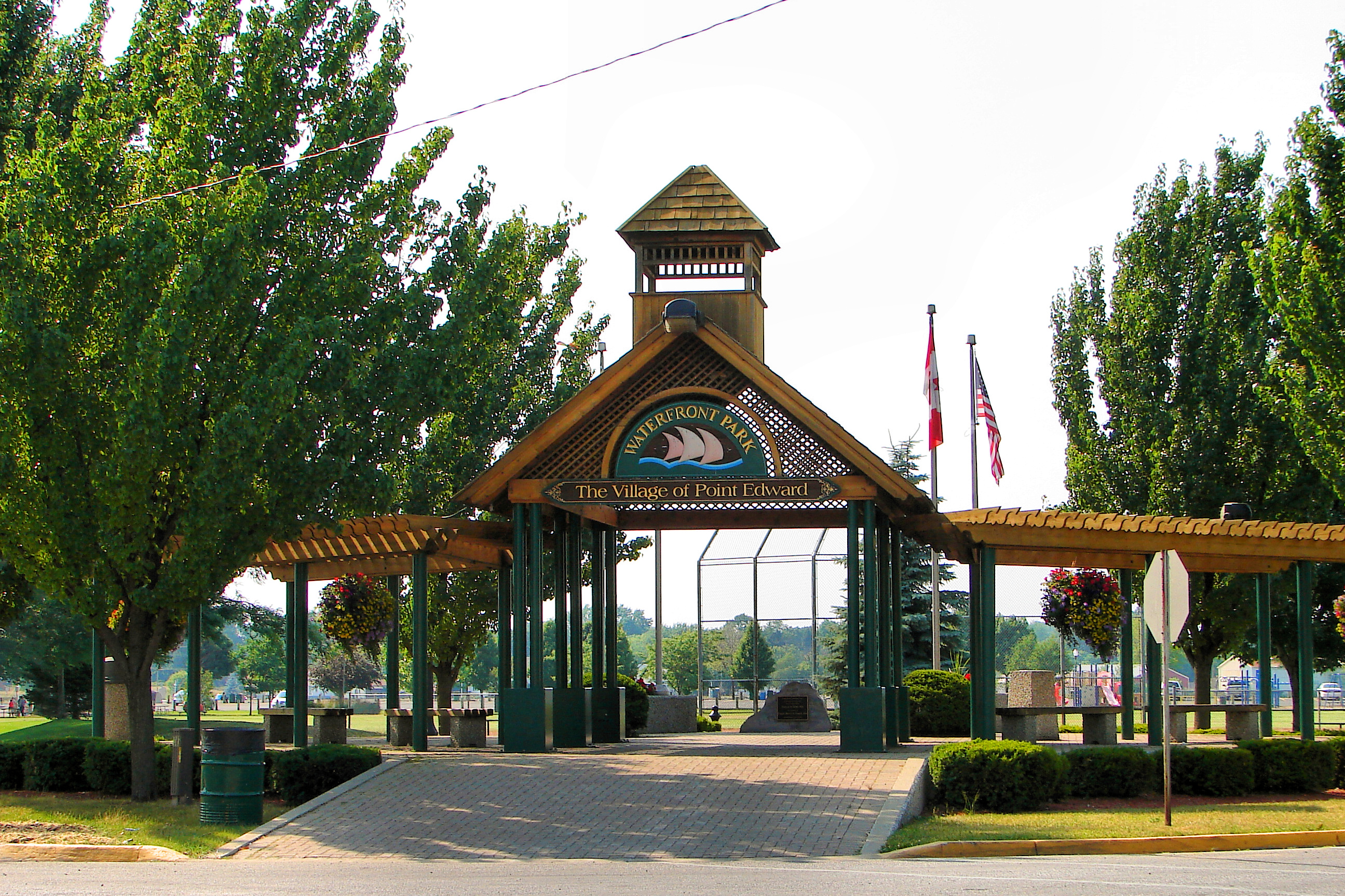
Waterfront Park

- Waterfront Park
- Veterans Memorial Park
- Simpson Street Park
- Elks Park
- Optimist Park
- Helena Street Park
- Hillier Park
- McCrae Park
- Tennis Courts

== Notable residents ==
- Brad Boston, sailor who competed in the 1996 Summer Olympics
- Don Burgess, ice hockey left winger
- William Guthrie, member of the Legislative Assembly of Ontario
- Duke Harris, ice hockey right winger
- Peter Mara, ice hockey forward

== See also ==
- Royal eponyms in Canada
