= Thomas Edison Depot Museum =

- Grand Trunk Western Railroad Depot
- U.S. National Register of Historic Places
- Michigan State Historic Site
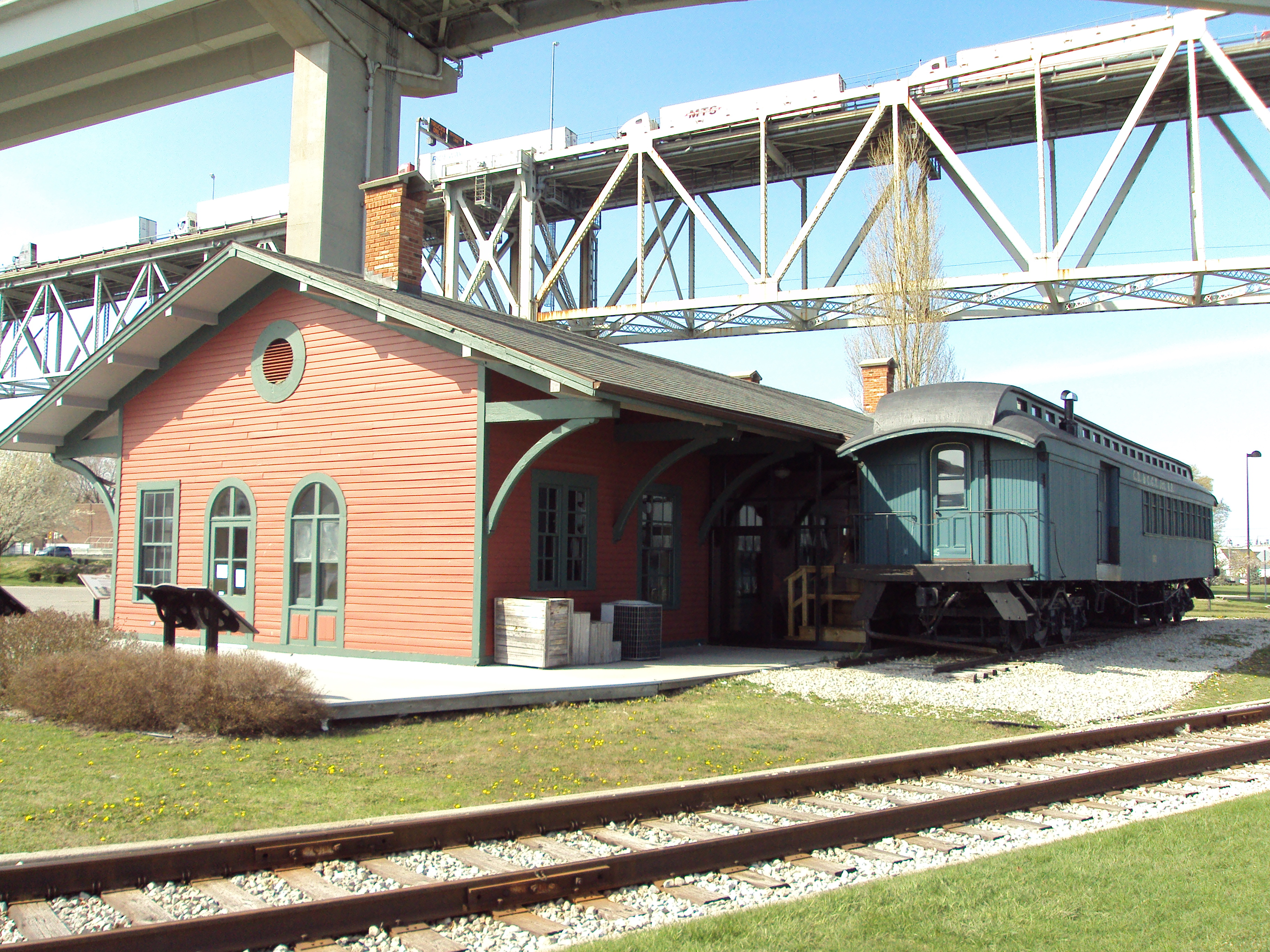

- Location within Michigan Location within the United States
- Interactive map
- Location: 520 State St., Port Huron, Michigan
- Coordinates: 42°59′55″N 82°25′34″W
- Area: less than one acre
- Built: 1858
- Architectural style: Italian Villa
- NRHP reference No.: 77001397
- Added to NRHP: April 13, 1977

The Thomas Edison Depot Museum (previously the Grand Trunk Western Railroad Depot) is a former railway depot located at 520 State Street in Port Huron, Michigan. It has been converted into a museum. The building was listed on the National Register of Historic Places in 1977.

== History ==
The Canadian Grand Trunk Railway Company constructed this building as the Gratiot Railway Station in 1858. It served as a major port for immigrants passing from Canada into the United States, and by 1869, approximately 42,000 immigrants had passed through the station. Near the station lived a young Thomas Edison, who worked at the station as a news butcher from 1859 to 1863.

A larger, two-story station was constructed in 1907. In approximately the mid-1920s, the 1858 depot was converted to office space by the Peerless Cement Company. The 1907 depot was used until 1971 and demolished in 1973.

The Port Huron Museum opened the Thomas Edison Depot Museum in the building in 2001. The depot is owned and operated by the Port Huron Museums and is the actual depot that Thomas Edison worked out of as a news reporter. The museum includes a restored baggage car resting on a short spur of railroad track. The museum houses artifacts from the archaeological dig done at the site of his boyhood home, which burned in 1870. Exhibits include original Edison phonographs being played, the world's largest light bulb, and displays about the early days of this famous inventor.

== Description ==
The Grand Trunk Western Railroad Depot is a single story rectangular seven-bay structure located near the Blue Water Bridge. The building has wood siding, and is topped with a low gabled roof. The roof is supported by gracefully carved brackets. It has a variety of windows throughout the building, including ocular vent openings suggestive of the elegance of the Italian Villa Style.

== Images ==
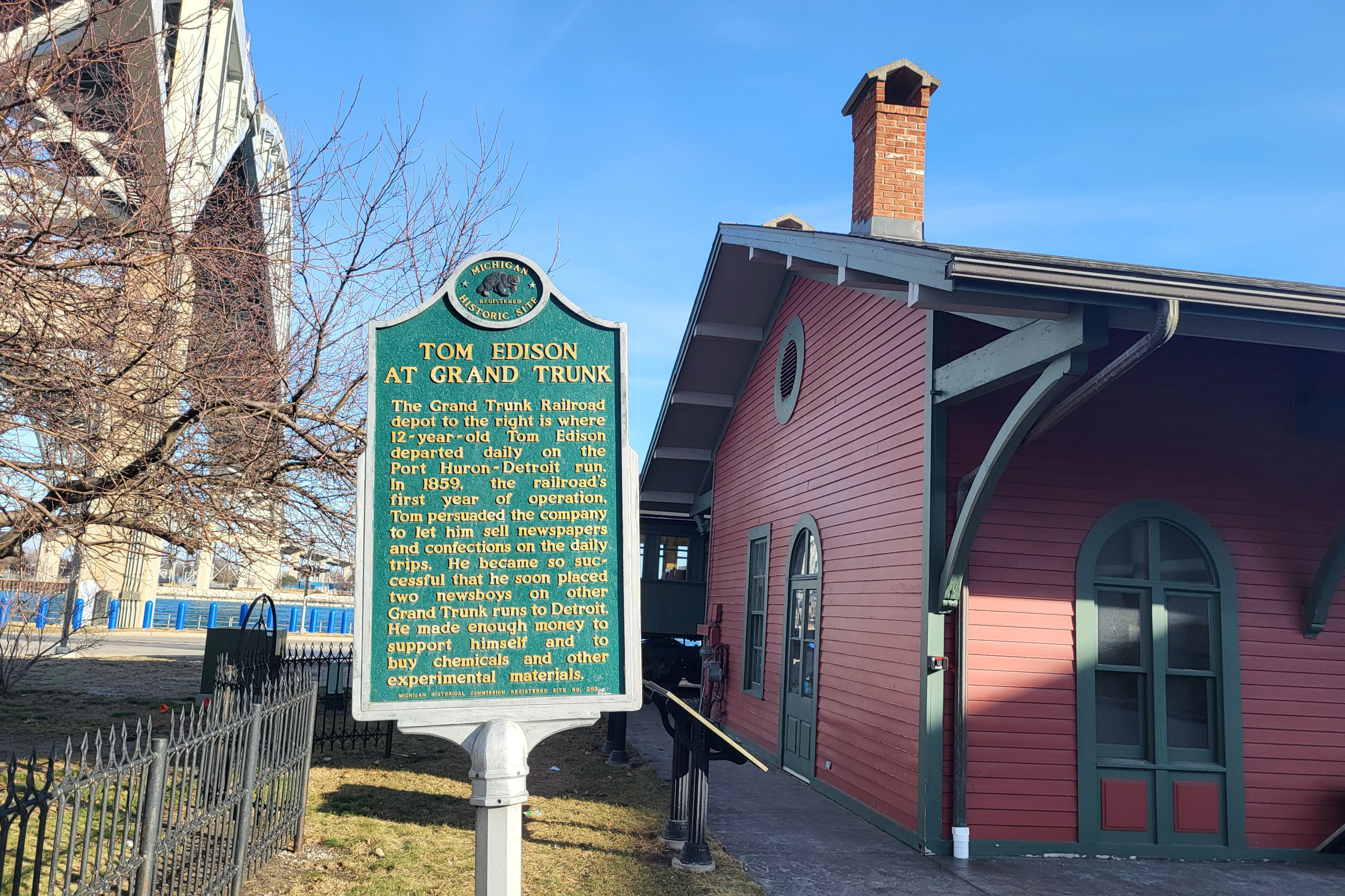
State historic marker

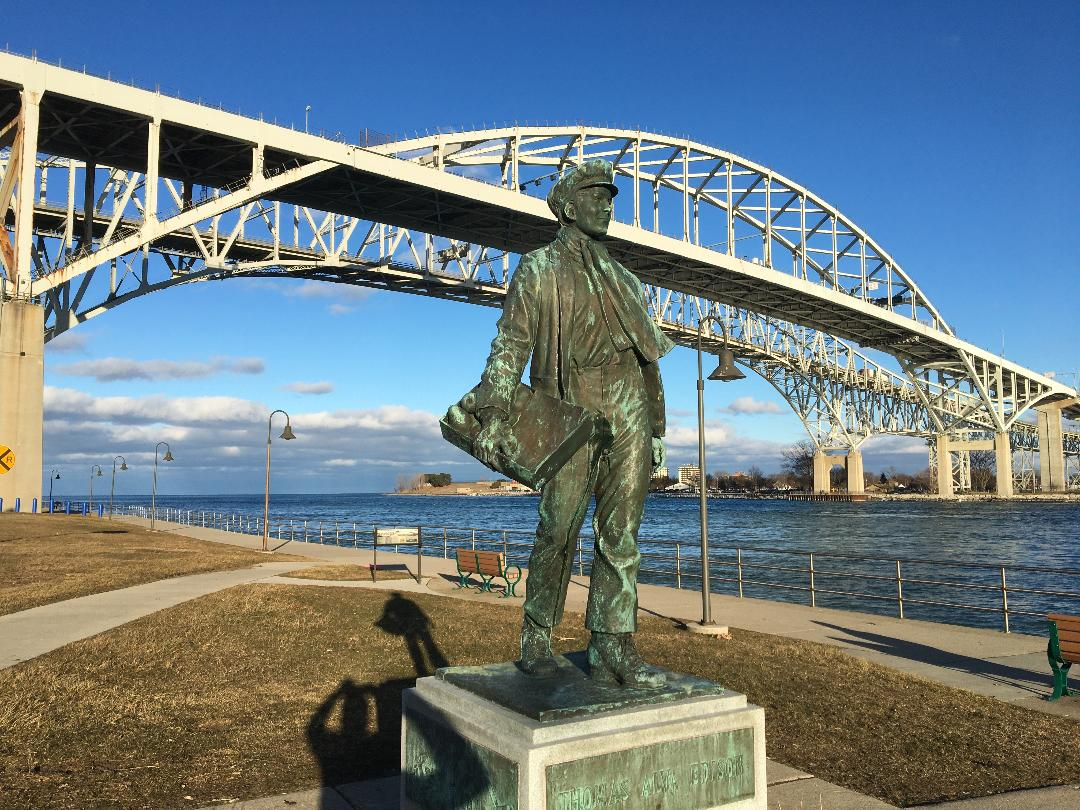
Thomas Edison statue along the river

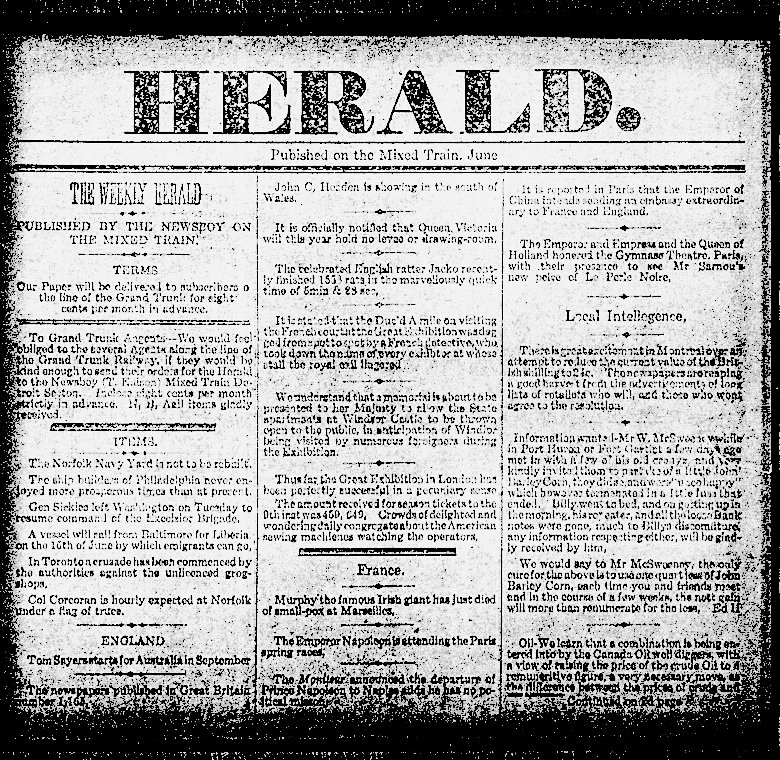
Sample of the newspaper Edison published aboard the train when he worked out of the station
