= Seaway International Bridge =

Bridge in Canada and the US

North Channel Span of Seaway International Bridge
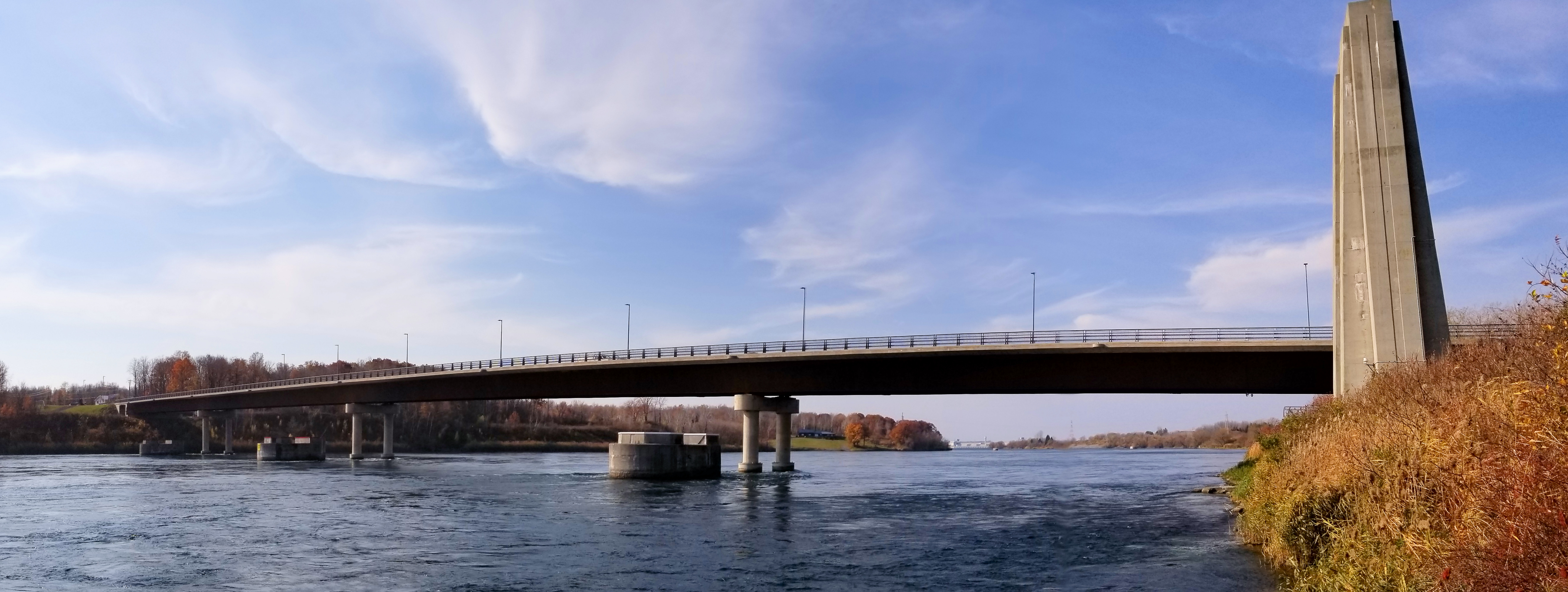
- Coordinates: 45.00°N 74.74°W
- Carries: Two lanes of traffic
- Crosses: St. Lawrence River
- Locale: Cornwall, Ontario
- Maintained by: Seaway International Bridge Corporation

Characteristics
- Design: Plate girder bridge
- Total length: 1,652 m (5,420 ft)
- Width: 8.2 m (27 ft)
- Height: 15 ft 6 in (4.72 m)
- Load limit: 115,000 lb (52,000 kg)

History
- Opened: 2014

Statistics
- Daily traffic: 7,000–9,000 Cars Daily
- Toll: $5.25 CDN/$3.00 USD

Location
- Interactive map of North Channel Span of Seaway International Bridge

South Channel Bridge of Three Nations Crossing
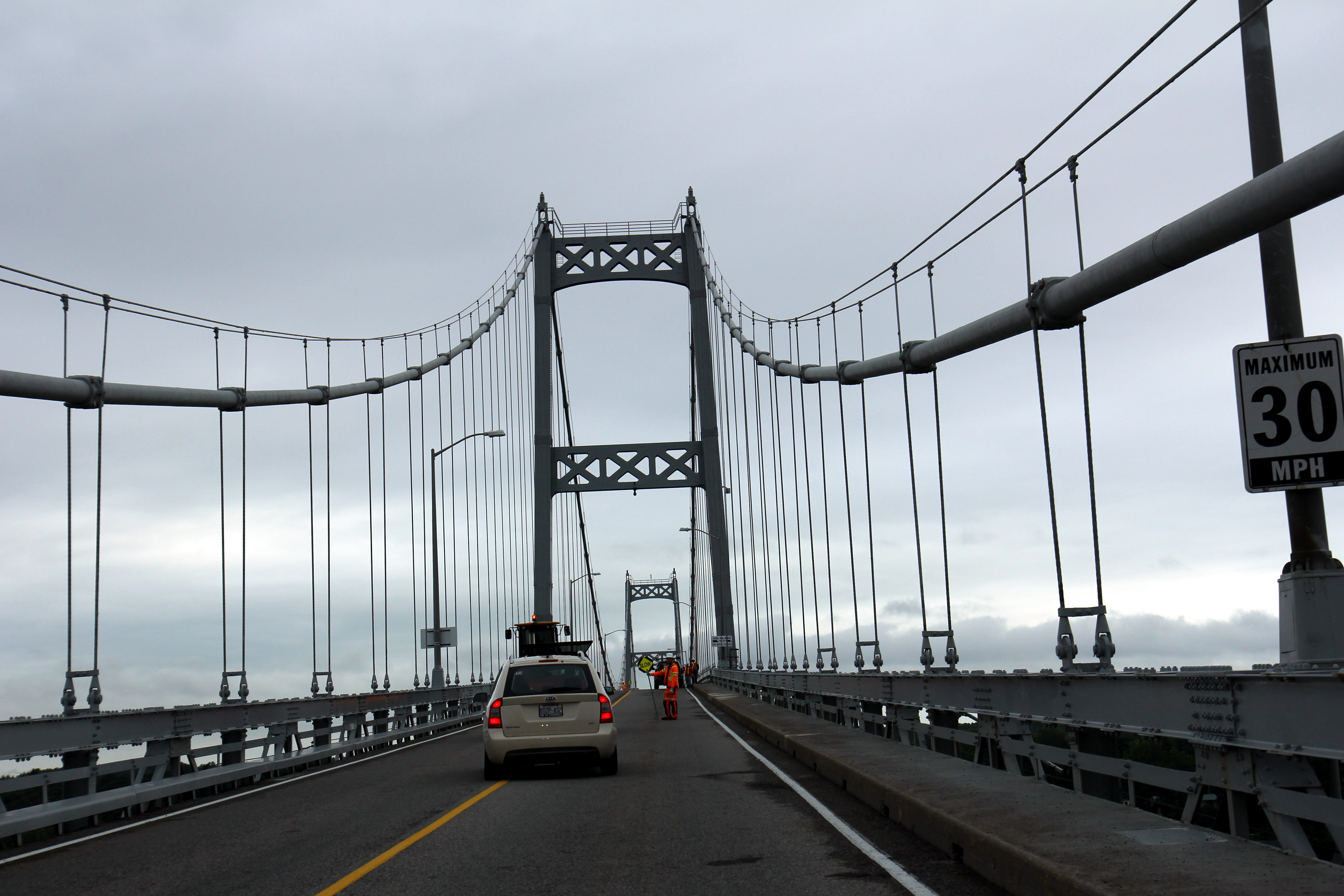
- Coordinates: 45°00′N 74°44′W
- Carries: Two Lanes of Traffic
- Crosses: St. Lawrence River
- Locale: Akwesasne Mohawk Territory/Cornwall, Ontario/Massena, New York
- Maintained by: Seaway International Bridge Corporation

Characteristics
- Design: Suspension bridge
- Total length: 1,060 m (3,480 ft)
- Width: 8.2 m (27 ft)
- Height: unknown
- Longest span: 275 m (902 ft)
- Load limit: 115,000lbs
- Clearance above: 35.5 m (116 ft)

History
- Designer: Hugh and Philip Louis Pratley
- Opened: 1958

Statistics
- Daily traffic: 7,000–9,000 Cars Daily

Location
- Interactive map of South Channel Bridge of Three Nations Crossing

The Seaway International Bridge is an international crossing connecting the U.S. state of New York, Akwesasne Mohawk Territory, and the Canadian province of Ontario. It consists of the South and North Channel Bridges that originally opened in 1958, and spans the St. Lawrence Seaway. The North Channel Bridge, connecting the City of Cornwall in Ontario to Cornwall Island in Akwesasne Mohawk Territory, was rebuilt and opened in 2014.

The bridge is among the busiest on the Canada–United States border in the state of New York, with about two million crossings a year. It is jointly owned by the Federal Bridge Corporation (a Crown corporation of the Canadian federal government) and the Great Lakes St. Lawrence Seaway Development Corporation (an agency of the United States Department of Transportation), and is operated by the Seaway International Bridge Corporation, which came under the control of the Federal Bridge Corporation from the Saint Lawrence Seaway Authority in 1998.

== History ==
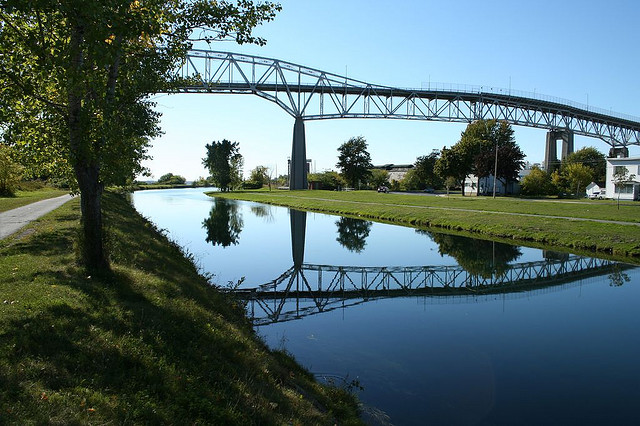
Former high arch-truss bridge over the north channel

Previously known as the Cornwall-Massena International Bridge, the SIBC was a private bridge whose outstanding stock was purchased by the Saint Lawrence Seaway Authority (Canada) and the Saint Lawrence Seaway Development Corporation (U.S.) in 1957. It was incorporated in Canada five years later.

In 2000, the international border crossing that the Seaway International Bridge comprises was named the Three Nations Crossing, in recognition that it connects the Akwesasne Mohawk Territory, a self-governing nation, to the United States and Canada.

On January 24, 2014, the opening of a new lower-level bridge marked the official closing of the former high-level North Channel crossing of the Seaway International Bridge. This project was estimated to cost $75 million, entirely funded by the Government of Canada. It was announced in 2010 that the Government of Canada would be going forward with this project that would involve the construction of a new low-level bridge as well as the demolition of the Seaway International Bridge to ensure the longevity of the border crossing, assuring that the former bridge was still in safe driving condition. The high-level Seaway International Bridge was completely demolished in 2015. At the opening ceremony of the new bridge, the first person to make the crossing was Raymonde Champagne, who had also been the first person to cross the high-level bridge in 1962.

== Border crossing ==
The Three Nations Crossing is the border crossing associated with the Seaway International Bridge. It was named in 2000, in honor of the Mohawk of Akwesasne, a federally recognized tribe in the United States and First Nation in Canada. Their reserve extends across the international border, in addition to that between Quebec and Ontario. Most of the land is in New York, United States.

== See also ==
- List of crossings of the Saint Lawrence River
- List of international bridges in North America
- Cornwall Island (Ontario)
