= Blue Water Bridge =

Twin-span bridge between Point Edward, Ontario, Canada and Port Huron, Michigan, US

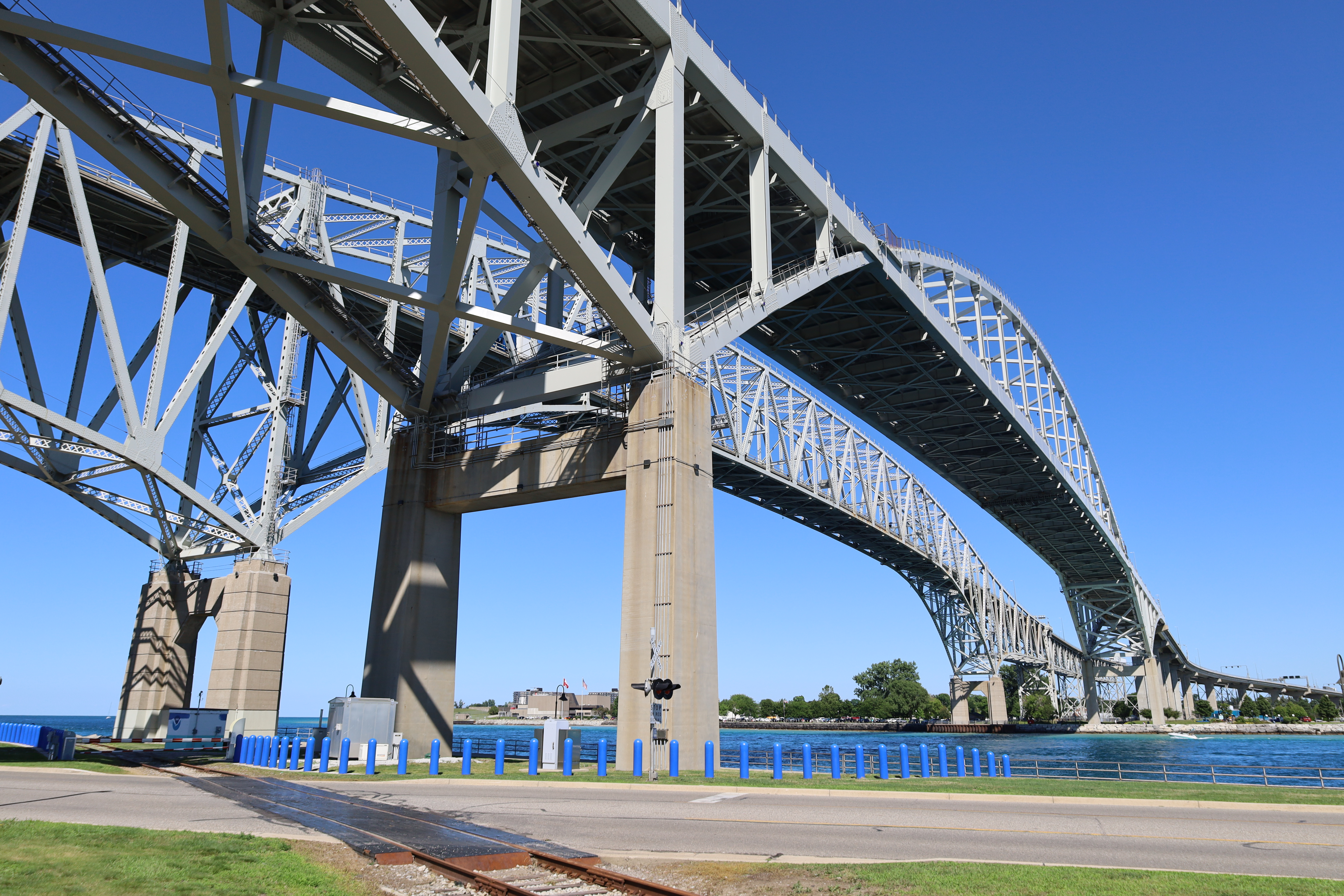
- The bridge in 2025, with the 1938 span behind the 1997 span
- Coordinates: 42°59′55″N 82°25′25″W
- Carries: 6 lanes of I-69 / I-94 and Highway 402 (westbound span, 3 lanes; eastbound span, 3 lanes)
- Crosses: St. Clair River
- Locale: Port Huron, Michigan and Point Edward, Ontario
- Official name: Blue Water Bridge
- Maintained by: MDOT and FBCL

Characteristics
- Design: Cantilever truss (westbound); Continuous tied arch (eastbound)
- Total length: 6,178 ft (1,883 m) (westbound); 6,109 ft (1,862 m) (eastbound)
- Width: 38 ft (12 m) (westbound); 51 ft (16 m) (eastbound)
- Height: 210 ft (64 m) (westbound); 233 ft (71 m) (eastbound)
- Longest span: 871 ft (265 m) (westbound); 922 ft (281 m) (eastbound)
- Clearance below: 152 ft (46 m) (westbound); 155 ft (47 m) (eastbound)

History
- Opened: October 10, 1938; 88 years ago (westbound); July 22, 1997; 29 years ago (eastbound)

Statistics
- Daily traffic: 13,100 (2015); 14,700 (2014); 14,800 (2013)
- Toll: Cars: US$3.00 or C$4.00 (to Canada) and US$3.25 or C$4.25 (to US) As of January 28, 2020 Extra axles: US$3.00 or C$4.00 (to Canada) and US$3.25 or C$4.25 (to US) Trucks & buses: US$3.25 or C$4.25 per axle (to Canada) and US$3.50 or C$4.50 per axle (to US). C$4.25 per axle with Prepaid Account (to US).

Location
- Interactive map of Blue Water Bridge

The Blue Water Bridge is a twin-span international bridge across the St. Clair River that links Port Huron, Michigan, United States, and Point Edward, Ontario, Canada. The Blue Water Bridge connects Highway 402 in Ontario with both Interstate 69 (I-69) and Interstate 94 (I-94) in Michigan. The original span of the bridge opened in 1938, and a companion span opened in 1997.

== Description ==
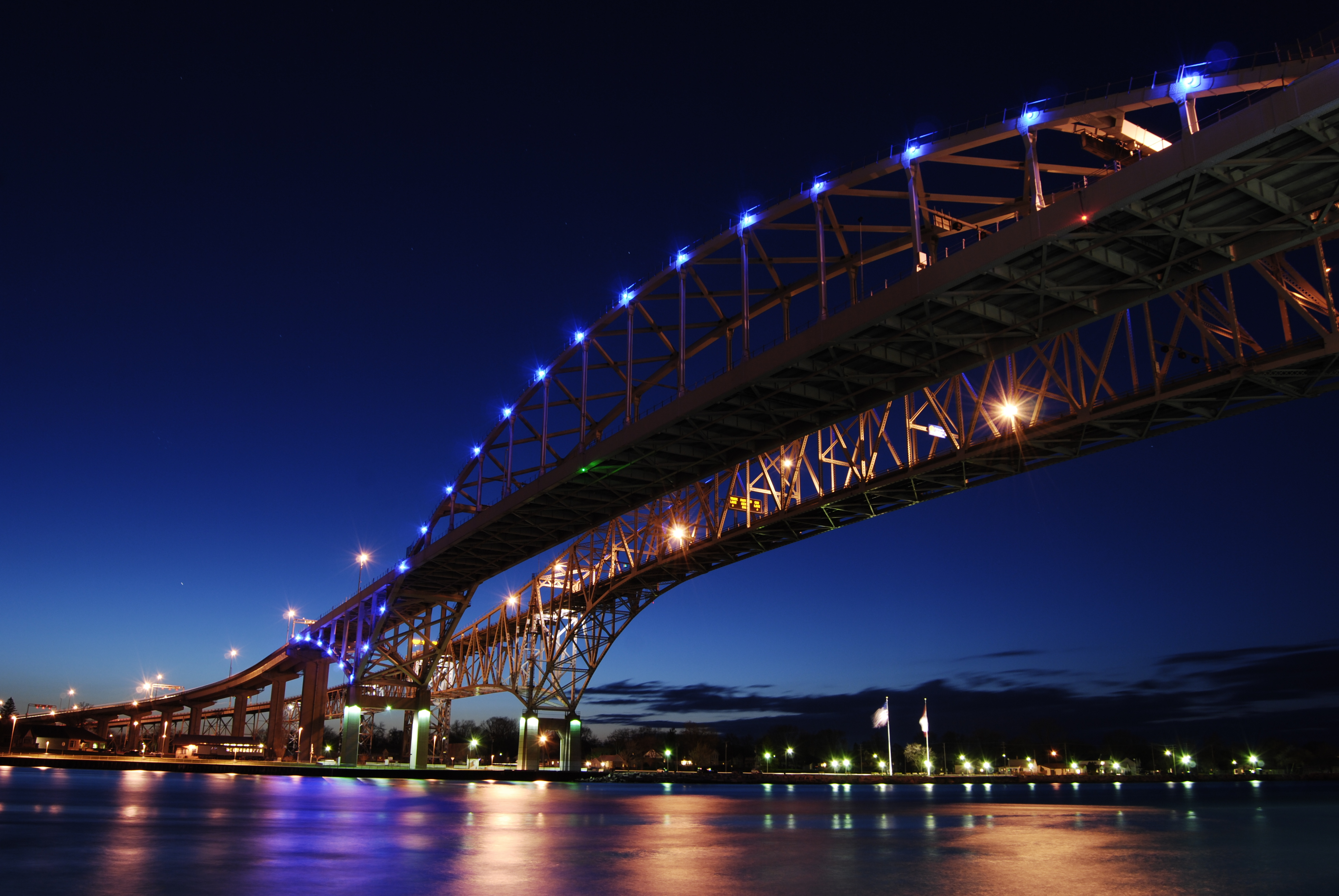
The bridge at night in 2009, with the newer bridge in the foreground

The original span is a cantilever truss bridge with a total length of 6,178 ft (1,883 m) and a main span of 871 ft (265 m). The second, newer span is a continuous bowstring arch bridge with a total length of 6,109 ft (1,862 m) and a main span of 922 ft (281 m).

The Blue Water Bridges are jointly owned and maintained by Canada and the United States: Federal Bridge Corporation, a Crown corporation of the Government of Canada, is in charge of the Canadian side, while the Michigan Department of Transportation (MDOT) is in charge of the US side. A toll is charged to cross the bridges, which is used to pay for maintenance and operations.

Together, the two bridges connect Chicago and the Midwestern United States with Toronto and the Northeastern United States, one of the four shortest routes of land travel between the US Midwest and Northeast. They are the second-busiest commercial crossing on the Canada–United States border, after the Ambassador Bridge at Detroit-Windsor, and the fourth-busiest overall international crossing in Ontario in terms of total number of vehicles at 4.7 million annually as of 2011. In Canada, they are the third-busiest bridges after the Samuel-De Champlain Bridge in Montreal and the Ambassador Bridge.

The Port Huron–Sarnia Border Crossing connects the cities of Port Huron, Michigan, and Point Edward, Ontario, at the Blue Water Bridge. Both the US and Canada border stations are open 24 hours per day. The US Customs and Border Protection upgraded its inspection facilities in 2011, and Canada Border Services Agency upgraded its facilities in 2012. In 2017, inspectors at Port Huron processed 1,579,646 cars and 826,288 trucks.

== History ==
=== Planning and construction ===
A U.S. Port of Entry had been established at the location in 1836, when a license to provide commercial ferry service between Port Huron and what then was known as Port Sarnia. The license was issued to a Canadian man named Crampton who operated a sailboat. In the 1840s, a man named Davenport, also from Port Sarnia, operated a pony-powered vessel. Steam-powered vessels and paddle wheelers soon followed, but the first vessel capable of carrying automobiles did not arrive until 1921.

In 1935, the Michigan Legislature passed a law (Public Act 147 of 1935) creating a State Bridge Commission to finance the design and erection of the main bridge structure of the Blue Water Bridge. In 1937, after plans proposed in 1927 to build a bridge spanning the St. Clair River languished during the Great Depression, the Michigan Highway Commission and the Minister of Highways for Canada hired Ralph Modjeski and Frank H. Masters and their Canadian associates, Charles Monsarrat and Philip Louis Pratley to design and build what would become the Blue Water Bridge. Modjeski, a Polish-born engineer who would become known as "America's greatest bridge builder", served as lead engineer for the project. In developing a design, Modjeski faced obstacles posed by the U.S. Army Corps of Engineers, which sought to ensure that the St. Clair River remain navigable for military and commercial vessels. Bridge construction could not interfere with navigation, bridge builders could not use floating platforms, and the completed span was required to clear the water by 150 ft (46 m).

Originally, Modjeski proposed a mammoth suspension-style bridge with tall towers and massive cable anchorages; however, because of the 150 ft (46 m) vertical clearance requirement for shipping, he opted instead for a cantilevered through-truss design. The commission was approved by the United States Congress in August 1935 (Public Law 411 of 1935). The law permitted the commission to sell bonds that would be repaid by the revenue from the tolls ($0.25 toll for travelers) collected within 30 years. The first bridge was fully opened to traffic on October 10, 1938. This bridge originally had two lanes for vehicles as well as sidewalks.

=== Operation ===
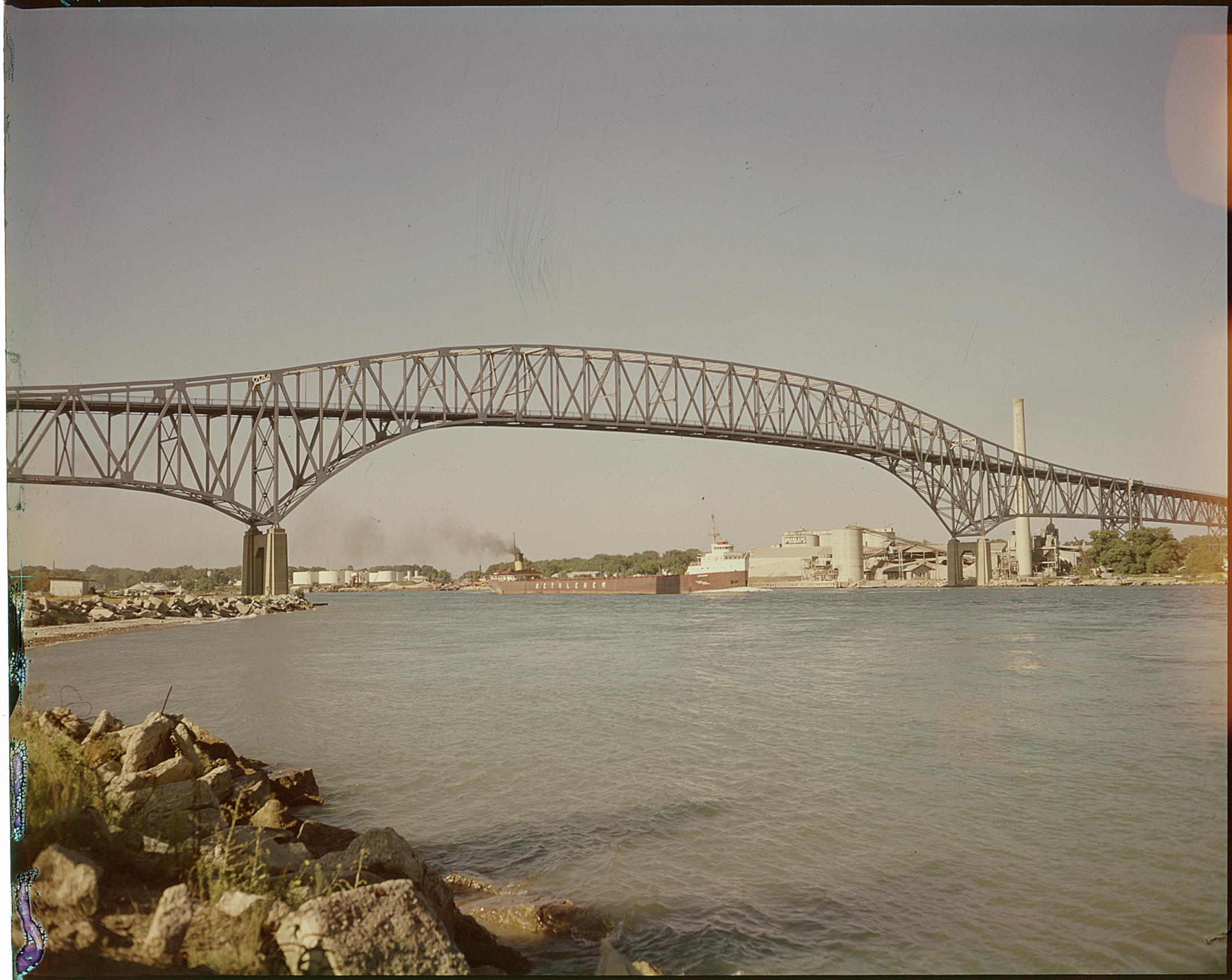
The bridge in 1958

In the 1950s, the facilities were upgraded, and the bridge’s lighting was completely replaced.

Both the U.S. and Canadian governments had agreed to operate the bridge toll-free once bonds were paid off. The U.S. side of the bridge became toll-free in February 1962, after the Governor John Swainson used an executive order to cancel the toll. This forced layoffs of the toll workers, one of which was his father. In August 1962, the BWB Authority (BWBA) that operates the Canadian side of the bridge began collecting tolls of $0.25 from eastbound traffic while continuing to collect tolls from westbound traffic. In June 1963, the State of Michigan appropriated funds for the operation of its part of the bridge.

In 1964, the eastern terminus of I-94 was completed at the foot of the Blue Water Bridge on the American side.

With the passage of the Executive Reorganization Act of 1965, the State Bridge Commission was abolished and its functions were transferred to the Michigan Department of Transportation (MDOT), then called the Department of State Highways.

In 1970, the U.S. Congress passed a law permitting Michigan to again collect tolls on the bridge. To comply with the law, the department had to repay the federal government $348,000 for the grant it received in 1938, which funded the approach road. That grant was repaid to the federal government and in September 1971, tolls were restored, however only collected in the eastbound direction on the Michigan side.

In 1982, Highway 402 was completed, and the Canadian approach had already been modified. This provided a continuous freeway link to Highway 401 on the Canadian side. Around this time, the bridge's sidewalk was also removed; this was done to add a third Reversible lane on the roadway, as long lineups on each side's crossing were common.

In 1984, I-69 was completed to Port Huron which meant that three freeways converged on the three-lane bridge.

In 1985, the U.S. Congress allowed Michigan to increase the toll to create a state matching fund for proposed improvements to the bridge plaza. As a requirement for this authority, after the bonds for repayment of construction costs were retired, the tolls had to be reverted to levels sufficient to operate and maintain the structure and associated facilities. In July 1991, the Federal Highway Administration (FHWA) signed a "129A Agreement" with MDOT regarding the disposition of toll receipts. This agreement allowed the department to fund both the annual operating costs of the bridge and the state's matching share of the BWB Plaza Improvement Project. On the American side, the I-beam girder overpass crossing Pine Grove Avenue was replaced by a much wider embankment, which also added a four-story customs office building in the center. On the Canadian side, the original booths were demolished; they had been in use since 1938; while they were positively noted for their Art Deco style, they were too low to accommodate modern semi-trailer trucks which previously had to be directed to the outside. The $55 million plaza improvement project was completed in November 1996, at which the toll was reverted to its original cost.

=== Twinning in 1990s ===
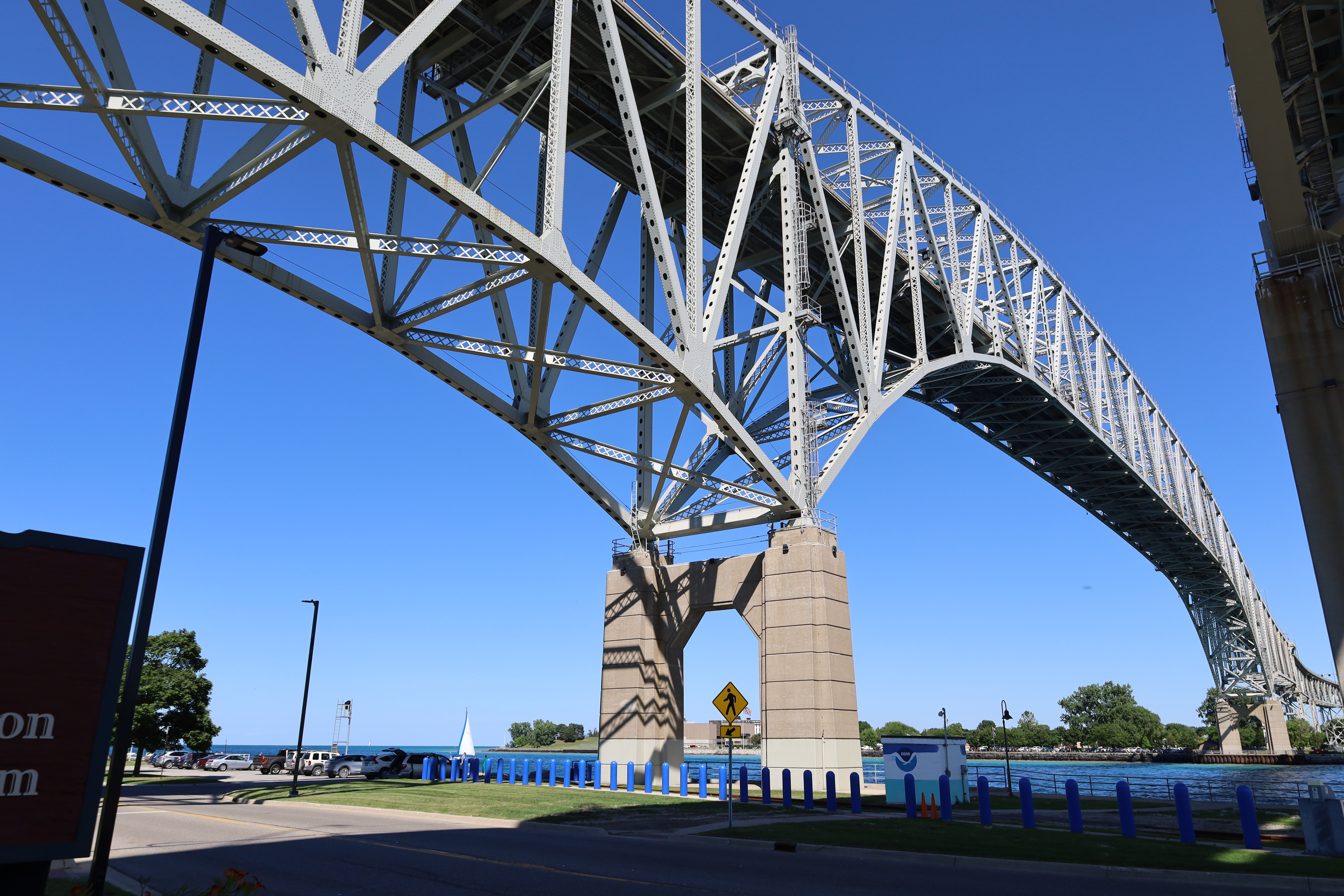
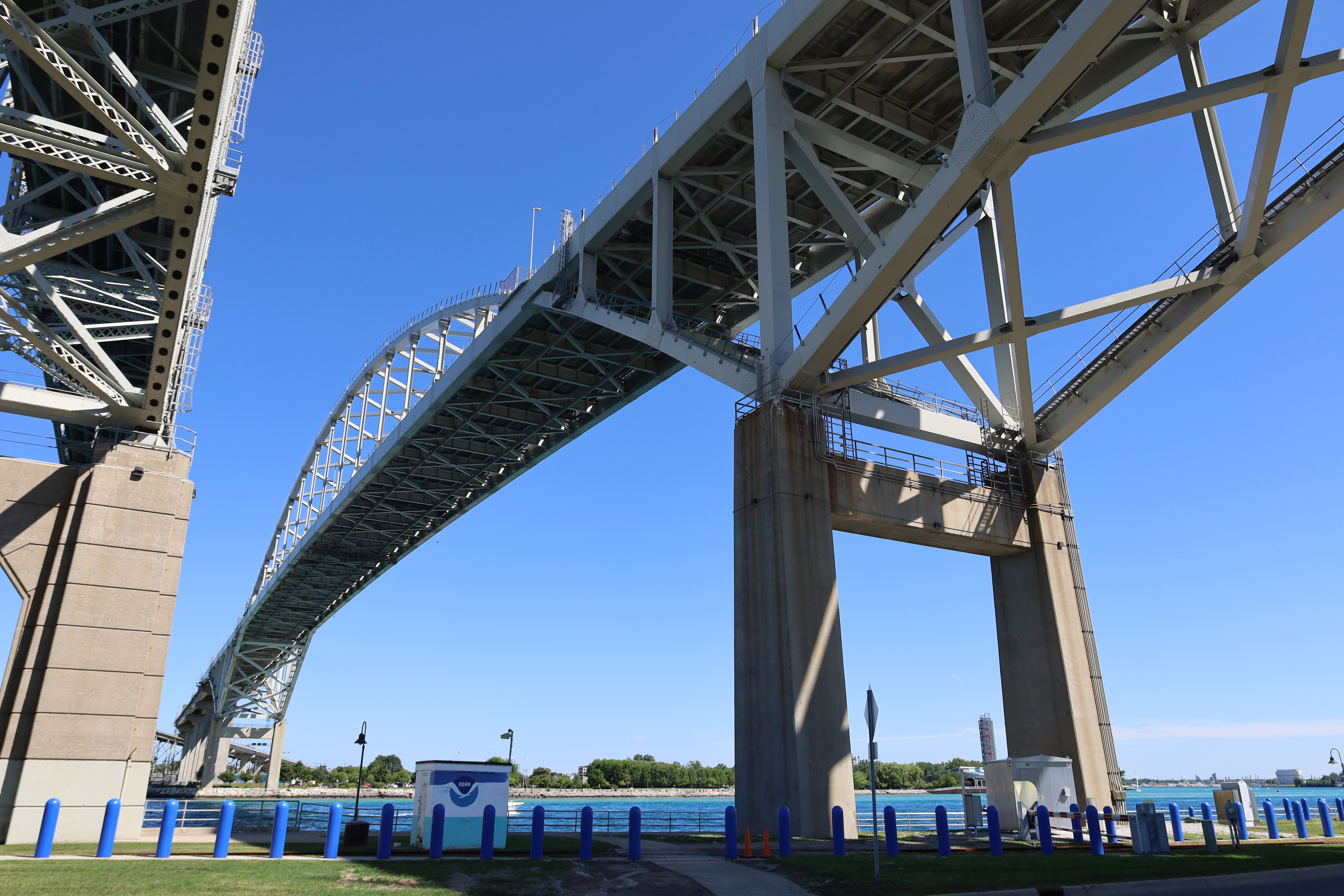
The 1938 span (top) and 1997 span (bottom) have different but complementary designs.

In 1992, it was determined that traffic on the bridge had exceeded its rated capacity, so bridge authorities decided to add a second span in order to accommodate the higher traffic.

During the debate over the form of the second span from 1994 to 1995, five possible designs were proposed. The parallel chord truss Bridge and the single-span tied-arch bridge proposals were the least popular as they were not visually appealing and dropped from further consideration. Over half of public opinion had favored a duplicate of the first bridge, while the cable-stayed bridge came in second with around 21% thanks to its "dramatic appearance and appeal to engineers because of their high structural redundancy". The Blue Water Bridge Authority had rejected both designs that topped public opinion, because the duplicate bridge would create a false sense of history, while the cable-stayed design would overshadow the existing bridge in height and proportion. The continuous-tied arch design, which was a distant third place in polls, was chosen for two reasons: one was that it blends in with the original span yet stands out on its own, and the other is lower maintenance costs because fewer spans are involved. The selection of the continuous-tied arch proposal was initially controversial as it did not have much public opinion support, and critics regarded this type as awkward. Consequently, the engineers changed design details to make it complement the existing bridge. For instance, the use of concrete piers and steel tower supporting the anchor span, rather than the traditional concrete tower, gave the bridge a "less massive appearance, easing the difficult transition between the approach, anchor and main spans".

The engineers also made "the main span attractive, but economical by settling on an innovative low arch design that merges the traffic deck with the bottom structural supporting steel for the portion of the bridge suspended over the water", which "eliminated the need for expensive bracing and contributes to the graceful appearance of the structure", while the flattened arch also better matches the old bridge. For the new bridge approaches the engineers selected concrete hammer-head piers over steel piers and deck trusses, not only for economical considerations, but it also "gives the new bridge a simpler look, making it easier to distinguish the old bridge from the new one" and "contributes to the clean lines of the new bridge and leaves the view of the old bridge's deck trusses uncluttered". Due to each country's manufacturing differences, the Americans used large pre-cast concrete beams (six beams for each segment) for the approaches while the Canadians used concrete pre-cast box girders (three box girders per segment). Despite this, the differing approach spans are the same depth and appear identical from the side view.

The twinning project was a combined effort between Modjeski & Masters (American engineers) and Buckland & Taylor Ltd. (Canadian engineers). During the construction, two temporary masts were erected to assist in the construction of the tied arch; the towers were painted red and lighted, enabling them to be seen from afar. The approaches to the new bridge use box girders, compared to the original which hold up the road deck with trusses. The second three-lane bridge, just south of the first bridge, opened on July 22, 1997. After the new bridge opened for traffic it served both directions from 1997 to 1999, with a flyover ramp on the Michigan side to temporarily direct westbound traffic to the north of the U.S. toll plaza, while the original bridge was closed for replacement of the bridge deck, guardrail, and lighting, the latter two aspects being the same/similar to the new bridge. Upon reopening, the original bridge was re-striped with three westbound lanes, while the flyover ramp was closed off as the new bridge exclusively carried three eastbound lanes.

=== Later history ===
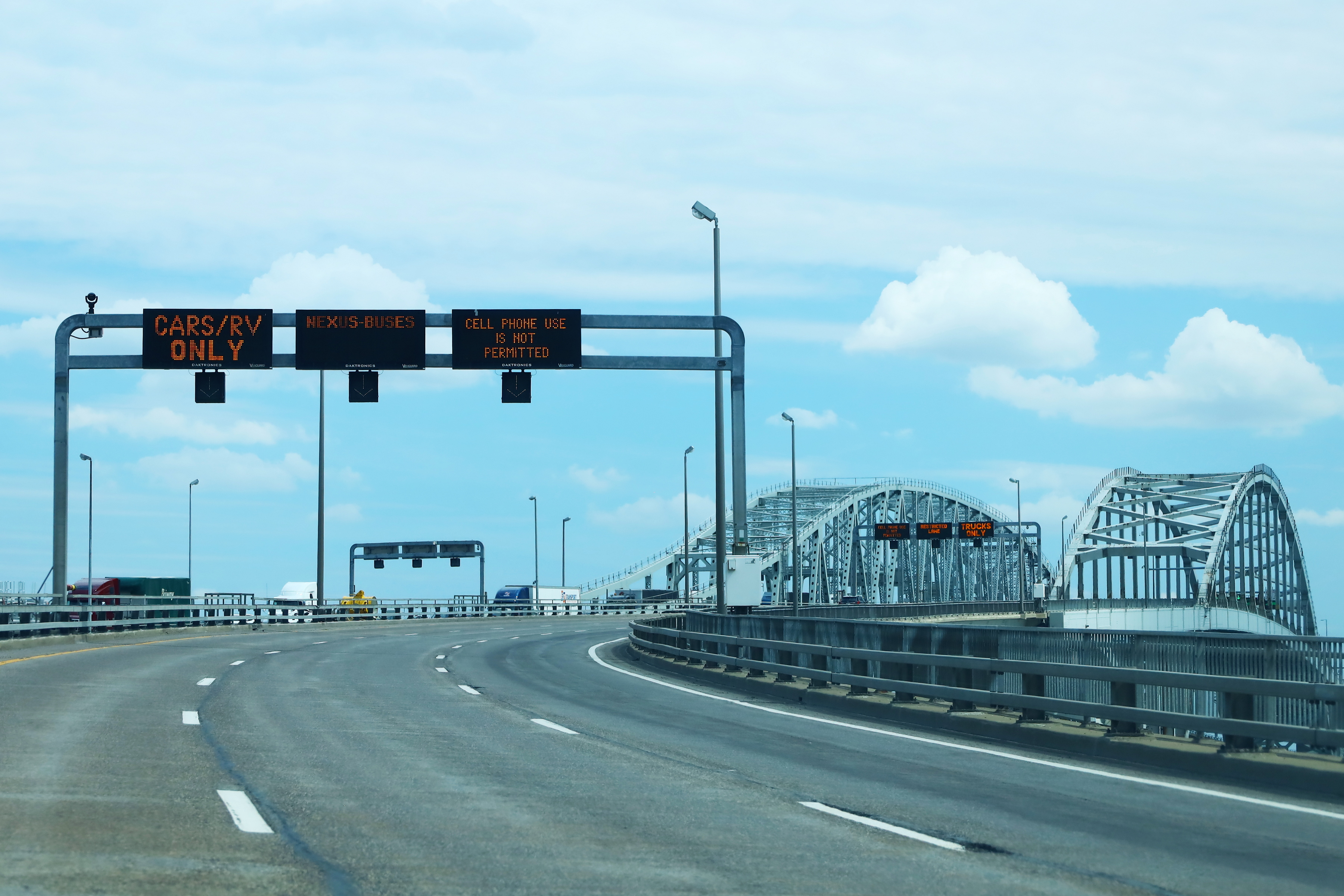
Approach deck of the bridge in 2023

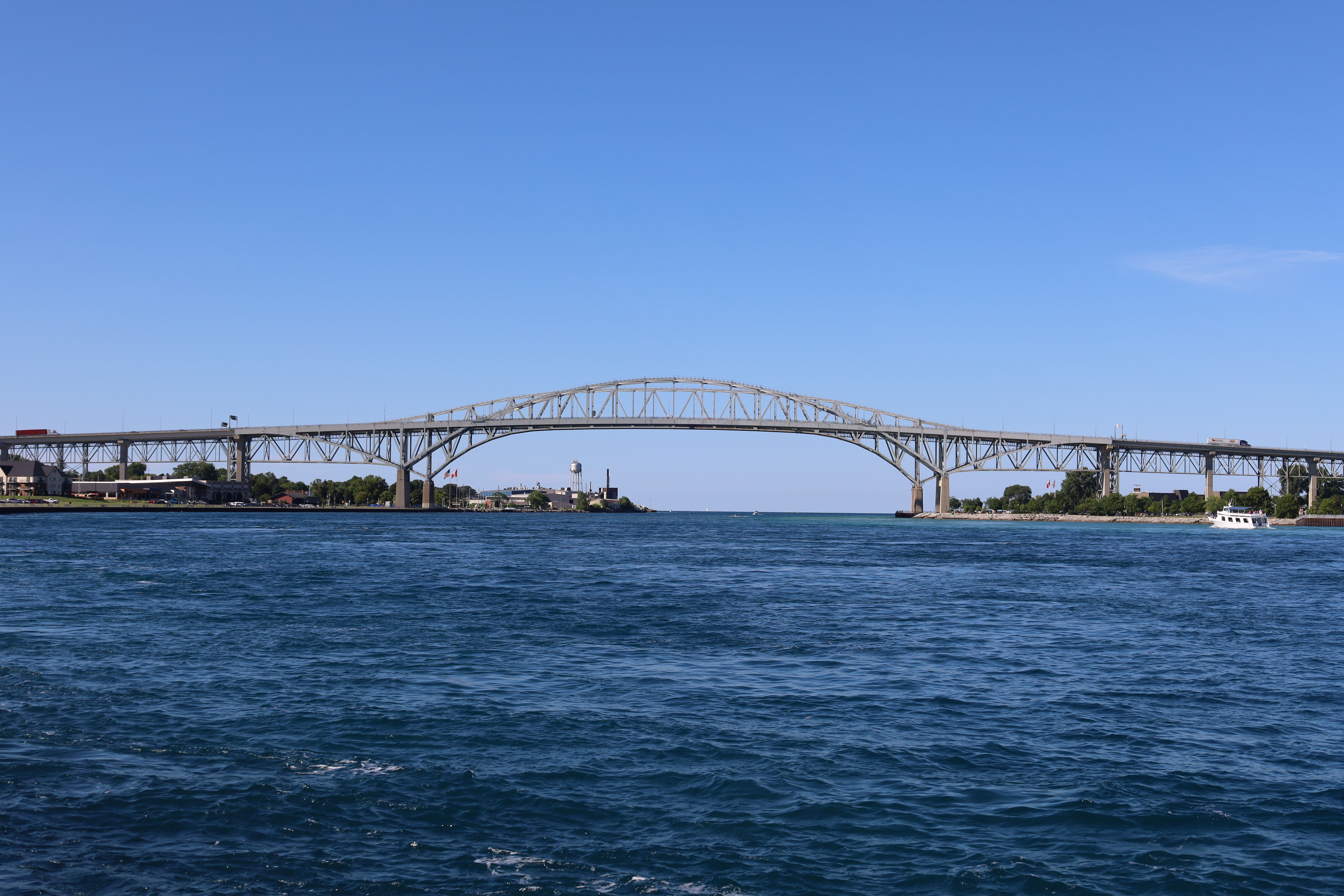
The bridge from downriver in 2025

In 2007, in accordance with Federal Identity Program requirements, the Blue Water Bridge Authority agreed on a name for the federal Crown corporate organization: Blue Water Bridge Canada.

In March 2009, the Canadian government announced that C$13.5 million (US$10.8 million) in funding would be allocated toward upgrading the border crossing facilities at the Blue Water Bridge. The work was scheduled to begin in May 2009. The US Customs and Border Protection would upgrade it on the US side, and the Canada Border Services Agency would upgrade it on the Canadian side. In 2011, the US side completed its plaza upgrades, and construction began to widen and improve both Highway 402 on the Canadian side and I-94/I-69 on the American side. In 2012, both the widening and the Canadian border upgrades were completed.

On April 1, 2015, the westbound span was closed to undergo resurfacing and waterproofing.

In 2018, the piers of the westbound bridge had protectors installed, additionally, new gusset plates were built.

On July 5, 2023, the westbound bridge was closed for blast cleaning, deck repairs, and other minor rehab work. It was reopened on October 3, 2 days ahead of schedule.

In 2020, cash was banned after the COVID-19 pandemic. It was made permanent by January 1, 2024.

Starting on May 29, 2024, the eastbound bridge was closed for maintenance, and all traffic was shifted onto the westbound bridge. The eastbound span of the Blue Water Bridge reopened on October 23, 2024.

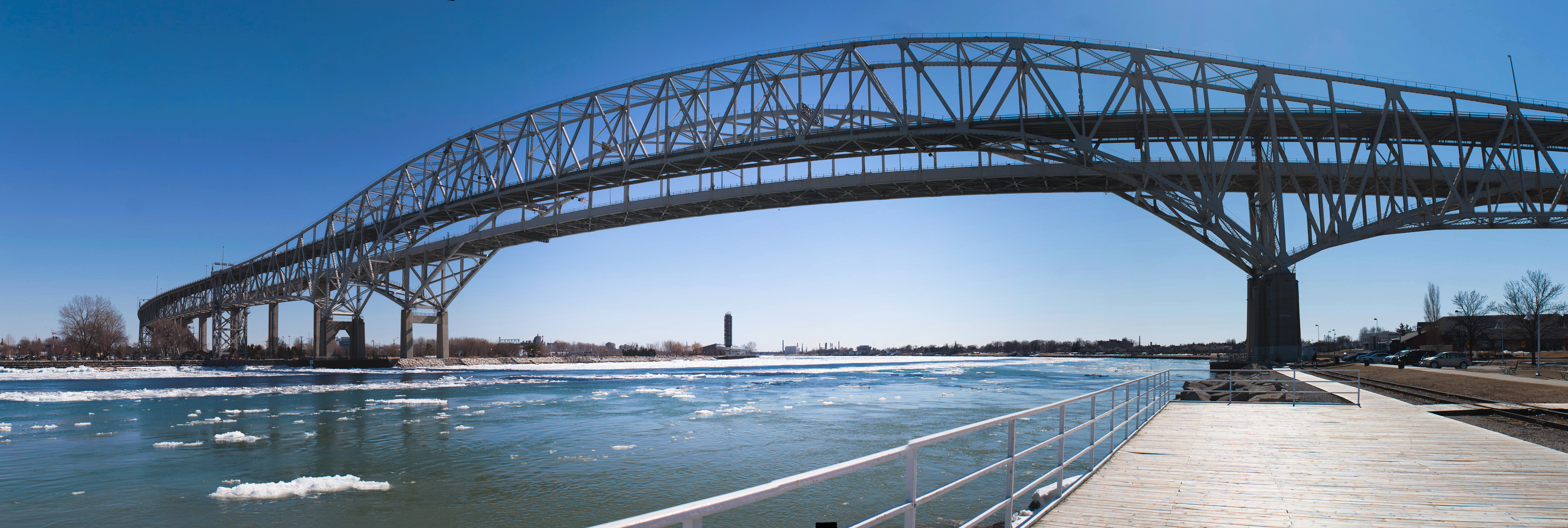
Blue Water Bridge, 2014

The Blue Water Bridge in Sarnia became the busiest Canada-U.S. trade corridor since 2025, surpassing Windsor due to the much higher tolls for the Ambassador Bridge as well as the delays in opening the Gordie Howe International Bridge, although construction for the latter was substantially completed in early 2026. For every month in 2025, the Blue Water Bridge surpassed the Ambassador Bridge in commercial truck traffic, with 2.1 million trips at Sarnia versus 1.9 million at Windsor, according to data from the Bridge and Tunnel Operators Association.

== See also ==
- List of bridges documented by the Historic American Engineering Record in Michigan
- List of bridges in Canada
- St. Clair Tunnel, a nearby international railroad tunnel
- List of international bridges in North America
