= Mohawk people =

Indigenous people of northeastern North America

Mohawk
Kanienʼkehá꞉ka
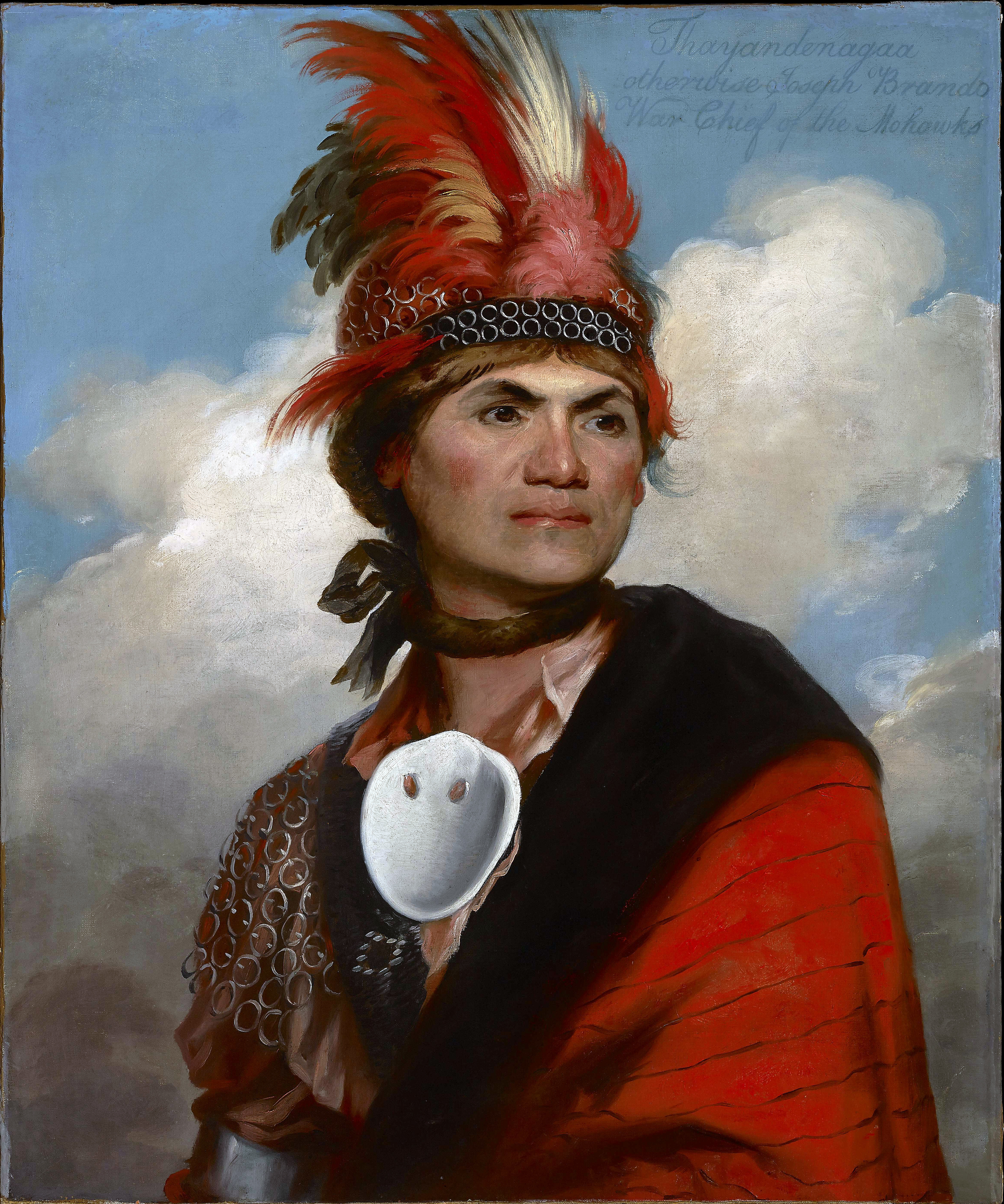
- Painting of Thayendanegea or Joseph Brant, by Gilbert Stuart (1786)

Total population
- 45,317

Regions with significant populations
- Canada (Quebec, Ontario): 39,685
- United States (New York): 5,632

Languages
- English, Mohawk, French, ASL, LSQ, Formerly: Dutch, Mohawk Dutch, Hand Talk

Religion
- Haudenosaunee mythology, Longhouse/Karihwiio, Kanohʼhonʼio, Kahniʼkwiʼio, Christianity

Related ethnic groups
- Oneida people, Onondaga people, Cayuga people, Seneca people, other Iroquoian peoples

kanien "flint"
- People: Kanienʼkehá꞉ka
- Language: Kanienʼkéha
- Country: Kanièn꞉ke; Haudenosauneega

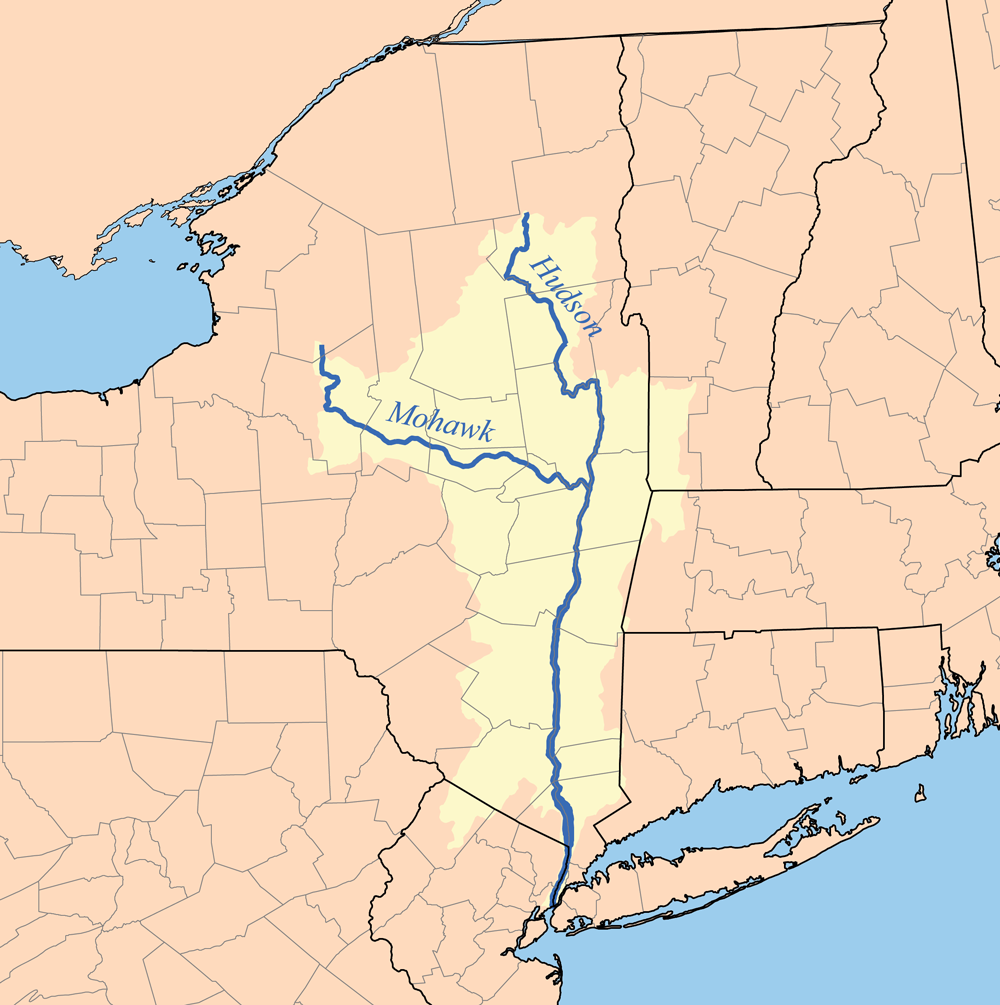
Map of Mohawk River

The Mohawk (/ˈmoʊhɔːk/), also known by their own name, Kanienʼkehá꞉ka (IPA: [ganjʌ̃ʔgɛháːga], lit. 'People of the Flint Place'), are an Indigenous people of the Northeastern Woodlands of North America and the easternmost nation of the Haudenosaunee, or Iroquois Confederacy (also known as the Five Nations or later, the Six Nations).

As the easternmost of the five original members of the Haudenosaunee Confederacy, the Mohawk are known as the Keepers of the Eastern Door. Their traditional territory centered around the Mohawk Valley in present-day upstate New York, west of the Hudson River, and ranged north to the St. Lawrence River, southern Quebec and eastern Ontario; south to greater New Jersey and into Pennsylvania; eastward to the Green Mountains of Vermont; and westward to the border with the Iroquoian Oneida Nation's traditional homeland territory.

Today, Mohawk people inhabit communities in northern New York State and southeastern Canada, primarily around Lake Ontario and the St. Lawrence River. Modern Mohawk communities include Akwesasne, Tyendinaga, Kahnawà:ke, Kanesatake, Wahta, and Six Nations of the Grand River, as well as numerous urban areas.

== Etymology ==
In the Mohawk language, the Mohawk people call themselves the Kanienʼkehá꞉ka ("People of the Flint Place"), from Kanièn꞉ke ("Flint Stone Place"). Their Algonquian-speaking neighbors and rivals, the Mohicans, called them Maqua, the Algonquian word for bear, and the Dutch adopted this as Maquas. The name Mohawk comes from a different term, in a southern New England Algonquian language, meaning roughly "they eat living things", potentially alluding to cannibals. The French called the Mohawk Agnier, which Hale traces to the Huron form of their name, Yanyenge, and also Maquis. They also used the generic name Iroquois, a French form of uncertain origin; the most commonly cited explanation is an Algonquian word, Irinakhoiw, glossed "real adders" (snakes).

== History ==
=== Precolonial ===
The Mohawk traditionally inhabited the upper Hudson (Mohawk: Kaʼnón:no) and Mohawk Valley (Teionontatátie) regions, which they called Kanièn:keh. Mohawk influence extended west of Lake Champlain (Kaniatarakwà:ronte) into the St. Lawrence River (Kenʼtarókwen, Kaniatarowanénhne, or Kahrhionhwa'kó:wa) Valley, which they maintained for hunting grounds. Within the Mohawk Valley, the Mohawk were agriculturalists, predominantly growing the Three Sisters of corn, beans, and squash by 1000 CE.

Following a period of much warfare, the Mohawk unified with the other four Haudenosaunee nations into the Haudenosaunee Confederacy (Rotinonhsón꞉ni) prior to the arrival of European settlers. Alongside the Great Peacemaker and Jigonhsasee, Mohawk-Onondaga leader Hiawatha played a central role in the traditional narrative of Haudenosaunee unification under the Great Law of Peace. Bordered by the Oneida to their west, the Mohawk form the Eastern Door of the traditional Confederacy longhouse and part of the Older Brother moiety along with the Seneca.

The Mohawk had contact with the Algonquian-speaking Mohican people who occupied territory along the Hudson, as well as other Algonquian and Iroquoian peoples to the north around the Great Lakes. The Mohawk likely defeated the St. Lawrence Iroquoians in the 16th century, and kept control of their territory.

=== First contact with European settlers ===
On June 28, 1609, a band of Wendat led Samuel De Champlain and his crew into Mohawk country, the Mohawks being completely unaware of this situation. De Champlain made it clear he wanted to strike the Mohawks down after their raids on the neighboring nations. On July 29, 1609, hundreds of Wendat and many of De Champlain's French crew fell back from the mission, daunted by what lay ahead. Sixty Wendat, De Champlain, and two Frenchmen saw some Mohawks in a lake near Ticonderoga (Tekaniataró:ken); the Mohawks spotted them as well. De Champlain and his crew fell back, then advanced to the Mohawk barricade after landing on a beach. They met the Mohawks at the barricade; 200 warriors advanced behind four chiefs. They were equally astonished to see each other—De Champlain surprised at their stature, confidence, and dress; the Mohawks surprised by De Champlain's steel cuirass and helmet. One of the chiefs raised his bow at Champlain and the Wendat. Champlain fired three shots that pierced the Mohawk chiefs' wooden armor, killing them instantly. The Mohawks stood in shock until they started flinging arrows at the crowd. A brawl began and the Mohawks fell back seeing the damage this new technology dealt on their chiefs and warriors. This was the first contact the Mohawks had with Europeans. This incident also sparked the Beaver Wars.

=== Beaver Wars ===
In the seventeenth century, the Mohawk encountered both the Dutch, who went up the Hudson River and established a trading post in 1614 at the confluence of the Mohawk and Hudson Rivers, and the French, who came south into their territory from New France (present-day Quebec). The Dutch were primarily merchants and the French also conducted fur trading. During this time the Mohawk fought with the Wendat in the Beaver Wars for control of the fur trade with the Europeans. Jesuit missionaries were active among the Indigenous peoples, seeking converts to Catholicism.

In 1614, the Dutch opened a trading post at Fort Nassau, New Netherland (known in Mohawk as Skahnéhtati). The Dutch initially traded for furs with the local Mohican, who occupied the territory along the Hudson River. Following a raid in 1626 when the Mohawks resettled along the south side of the Mohawk River, in 1628, they mounted an attack against the Mohican, pushing them back to the area of present-day Connecticut. The Mohawks gained a near-monopoly in the fur trade with the Dutch by prohibiting the nearby Algonquian-speaking peoples to the north or east to trade with them but did not entirely control this.

European contact resulted in a devastating smallpox epidemic among the Mohawk in 1635; this reduced their population by 63%, from 7,740 to 2,830, as they had no immunity to the new disease. By 1642 they had regrouped from four into three villages, recorded by Catholic missionary priest Isaac Jogues in 1642 as Ossernenon (Mohawk: Osserné:non), Andagaron, and Tionontoguen, all along the south side of the Mohawk River from east to west. These were recorded by speakers of other languages with different spellings, and historians have struggled to reconcile various accounts, as well as to align them with archeological studies of the areas. For instance, Johannes Megapolensis, a Dutch minister, recorded the spelling of the same three villages as Asserué, Banagiro, and Thenondiogo. Late 20th-century archeological studies have determined that Ossernenon was located about 9 miles west of the current city of Auriesville; the two were mistakenly conflated by a tradition that developed in the late 19th century in the Catholic Church.

While the Dutch later established settlements in present-day Schenectady (Ononʼonhrakónhne) and Schoharie (Ioskóhare), further west in the Mohawk Valley, merchants in Fort Nassau continued to control the fur trading. Schenectady was established essentially as a farming settlement, where the Dutch took over some of the former Mohawk maize fields in the floodplain along the river. Through trading, the Mohawk and Dutch became allies of a kind.

During their alliance, the Mohawks allowed Dutch Protestant missionary Johannes Megapolensis to come into their communities and teach the Christian message. He operated from the Fort Nassau area for about six years, writing a record in 1644 of his observations of the Mohawk, their language (which he learned), and their culture. While he noted their ritual of torture of captives, he recognized that their society had few other killings, especially compared to the Netherlands of that period.

The trading relations between the Mohawk and Dutch helped them maintain peace even during the periods of Kieft's War and the Esopus Wars, when the Dutch fought localized battles with other native peoples. In addition, Dutch trade partners equipped the Mohawk with guns to fight against other Indigenous peoples who were allied with the French, including the Ojibwe, Wendat, and Algonquin. In 1645, the Mohawk made peace for a time with the French, who were trying to keep a piece of the fur trade.

During the Pequot War (1634–1638), the Pequot and other Algonquian Indians of coastal New England sought an alliance with the Mohawks against English colonists of that region. Disrupted by their losses to smallpox, the Mohawks refused the alliance. They killed the Pequot sachem Sassacus who had come to them for refuge, and returned part of his remains to the English governor of Connecticut, John Winthrop, as proof of his death.

In the winter of 1651, the Mohawk attacked on the southeast and overwhelmed the Algonquian in the coastal areas. They took between 500 and 600 captives. In 1664, the Pequot of New England killed a Mohawk ambassador, starting a war that resulted in the destruction of the Pequot, as the English and their allies in New England entered the conflict, trying to suppress the Native Americans in the region. The Mohawk also attacked other members of the Pequot confederacy, in a war that lasted until 1671.

In 1666, the French attacked the Mohawk in the central New York area, burning the three Mohawk villages south of the river and their stored food supply. One of the conditions of the peace was that the Mohawk accept Jesuit missionaries. Beginning in 1669, missionaries attempted to convert Mohawks to Christianity, operating a mission in Ossernenon 9 miles west of present-day Auriesville, New York until 1684, when the Mohawks destroyed it, killing several priests.

Over time, some converted Mohawk relocated to Jesuit mission villages established south of Montreal (Tiohtià:ke) on the St. Lawrence River in the early 1700s: Kahnawake (Mohawk: Kahnawà꞉ke, historically spelled as Caughnawaga, named for the town of that name in the Mohawk Valley) and Kanesatake (Kanehsatà꞉ke). These Mohawk were joined by members of other Indigenous peoples but dominated the settlements by number. Many converted to Roman Catholicism. In the 1740s, Mohawk and French set up another village upriver, which is known as Akwesasne (Ahkwesáhsne). Today a Mohawk reserve, it spans the St. Lawrence River and present-day international boundaries to New York, United States, where it is known as the St. Regis Mohawk Reservation.

Kateri Tekakwitha, born at Ossernenon in the late 1650s, has become noted as a Mohawk convert to Catholicism. She moved with relatives to Caughnawaga on the north side of the Mohawk River after her parents' deaths. She was known for her faith and a shrine was built to her in New York. In the late 20th century, she was beatified and was canonized in October 2012 as the first Native American Catholic saint. She is also recognized by the Episcopal and Lutheran churches.

After the fall of New Netherland to England in 1664, the Mohawk in New York traded with the English and sometimes acted as their allies. During King Philip's War, Metacom, sachem of the warring Wampanoag Pokanoket, decided to winter with his warriors near Albany in 1675. Encouraged by the English, the Mohawk attacked and killed all but 40 of the 400 Pokanoket.

From the 1690s, Protestant missionaries sought to convert the Mohawk in the New York colony. Many were baptized with English surnames, while others were given both first and surnames in English.

During the late 17th and early 18th centuries, the Mohawk and Abenaki in New England were involved in raids conducted by the French and English against each other's settlements during Queen Anne's War and other conflicts. They conducted a growing trade in captives, holding them for ransom. Neither of the colonial governments generally negotiated for common captives, and it was up to local European communities to raise funds to ransom their residents. In some cases, French and Abenaki raiders transported captives from New England to Montreal and the Mohawk mission villages. The Mohawk at Kahnawake forcibly adopted numerous young women and children to add to their own members, having suffered losses to disease and warfare. For instance, among them were numerous survivors of the more than 100 captives taken in the Deerfield raid in western Massachusetts. The minister of Deerfield was ransomed and returned to Massachusetts, but his daughter was forcibly adopted by a Mohawk family and ultimately assimilated and married a Mohawk man.

During the era of the French and Indian War (also known as the Seven Years' War), Anglo-Mohawk partnership relations were maintained by men such as Sir William Johnson in New York (for the British Crown), Conrad Weiser (on behalf of the colony of Pennsylvania), and Hendrick Theyanoguin (for the Mohawk). Johnson called the Albany Congress in June 1754, to discuss with the Haudenosaunee chiefs repair of the damaged diplomatic relationship between the British and the Mohawk, along with securing their cooperation and support in fighting the French, in engagements in North America.

=== American Revolutionary War ===
During the second and third quarters of the 18th century, most of the Mohawks in the Province of New York lived along the Mohawk River at Canajoharie. A few lived at Schoharie, and the rest lived about 30 miles downstream at the Tionondorage Castle, also called Fort Hunter. These two major settlements were traditionally called the Upper Castle and the Lower Castle. The Lower Castle was almost contiguous with Sir Peter Warren's Warrensbush. Sir William Johnson, the British Superintendent of Indian Affairs, built his first house on the north bank of the Mohawk River almost opposite Warrensbush and established the settlement of Johnstown.

The Mohawk were among the four Haudenosaunee people that allied with the British during the American Revolutionary War. They had a long trading relationship with the British and hoped to gain support to prohibit colonists from encroaching into their territory in the Mohawk Valley. Joseph Brant acted as a war chief and successfully led raids against British and ethnic German colonists in the Mohawk Valley, who had been given land by the British administration near the rapids at present-day Little Falls, New York.

A few prominent Mohawk, such as the Pine Tree Chief Little Abraham (Tyorhansera) at Tionondorage, remained neutral throughout the war. Joseph Louis Cook (Akiatonharónkwen), a veteran of the French and Indian War and ally of the rebels, offered his services to the Americans, receiving an officer's commission from the Continental Congress. He led Oneida warriors against the British. During this war, Johannes Tekarihoga was the civil leader of the Mohawk. He died around 1780. Catherine Crogan, a Clan Mother and wife of Mohawk war chief Joseph Brant, condoled her brother Henry Crogan as the new Tekarihoga (Tekarihó:ken).

In retaliation for Brant's raids in the valley, the rebel colonists organized Sullivan's Expedition. It conducted extensive raids against other Haudenosaunee settlements in central and western New York, destroying 40 villages, crops, and winter stores. Many Mohawk and other Haudenosaunee migrated to Canada for refuge near Fort Niagara, struggling to survive the winter.

=== After the Revolution ===
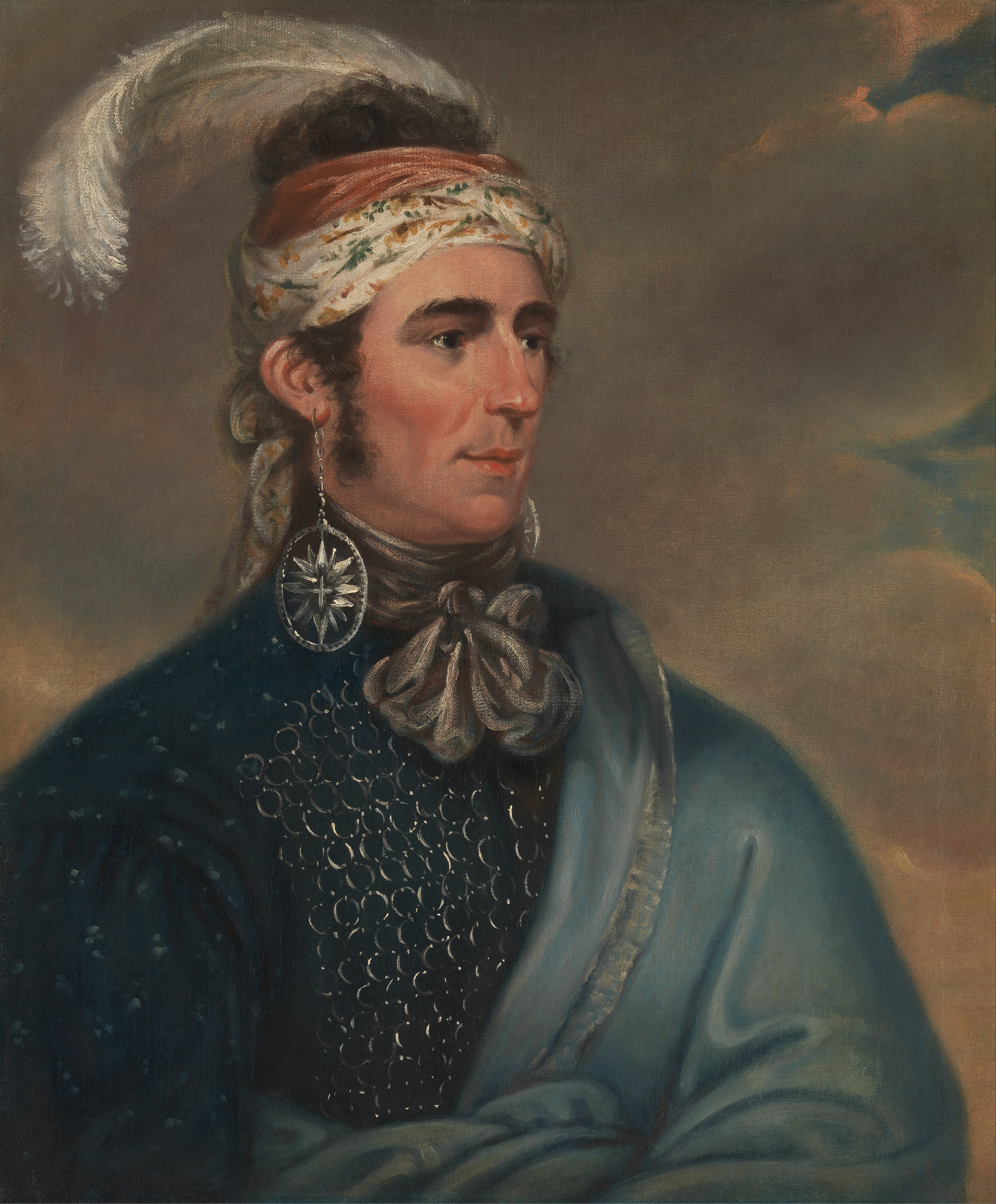
Teyoninhokarawen (John Norton) played a prominent role in the War of 1812, leading Haudenosaunee warriors from Grand River into battle against Americans. Norton was part Cherokee and part Scottish.

After the American victory, the British ceded their claim to land in the colonies, and the Americans forced their allies, the Mohawks and others, to give up their territories in New York. Most of the Mohawks migrated to Canada, where the Crown gave them some land in compensation. The Mohawks at the Upper Castle fled to Fort Niagara, while most of those at the Lower Castle went to villages near Montreal.

Joseph Brant led a large group of Haudenosaunee out of New York to what became the reserve of the Six Nations of the Grand River, Ontario (Ohswekenha'kà:ke). Brant continued as a political leader of the Mohawks for the rest of his life. This land extended 100 miles from the head of the Grand River (O:se Kenhionhata:tie) to the head of Lake Erie where it discharges. Another Mohawk war chief, John Deseronto, led a group of Mohawk to the Bay of Quinte (Kenhtè꞉ke). Other Mohawks settled in the vicinity of Montreal and upriver, joining the established communities (now reserves) at Kahnawake, Kanesatake, and Akwesasne.

On November 11, 1794, representatives of the Mohawk (along with the other Haudenosaunee nations) signed the Treaty of Canandaigua with the United States, which allowed them to own land there.

The Mohawks fought as allies of the British against the United States in the War of 1812.

=== 20th century to present ===
In 1971, the Mohawk Warrior Society or Rotiskenʼrakéhte was founded in Kahnawake. The duties of the Warrior Society are to use roadblocks, evictions, and occupations to gain rights for their people, and these tactics are also used among the warriors to protect the environment from pollution. The notable movements started by the Mohawk Warrior Society have been the Oka Crisis blockades in 1990 and the Caledonia Ontario, Douglas Creek occupation of a construction site in summer of 2006.

On May 13, 1974, at 4:00 a.m, Mohawks from the Kahnawake and Akwesasne reservations repossessed traditional Mohawk land near Old Forge, New York, occupying Moss Lake, an abandoned girls camp. The New York state government attempted to shut the operation down, but after negotiation, the state offered the Mohawk some land in Miner Lake, which they have since settled as the Ganienkeh Territory.

The Mohawks have organized for more sovereignty at their reserves in Canada, pressing for authority over their people and lands. Tensions with the Quebec provincial and national governments have been strained during certain protests, such as the Oka Crisis in 1990.

In 1993, a group of Akwesasne Mohawks purchased 322 acres of land in the Town of Palatine in Montgomery County, New York which they named Kanatsiohareke. It marked a return to their ancestral land.

=== Mohawk ironworkers in New York ===
Mohawks came from Kahnawake and other reserves to work in the construction industry in New York City in the early through the mid-20th century. They had also worked in construction in Quebec. The men were ironworkers (Rarihsta'kehró:non / Ratirihsta'kehró:non) who helped build bridges and skyscrapers, and who were called skywalkers because of their seeming fearlessness. They worked from the 1930s to the 1970s on special labor contracts as specialists and participated in building the Empire State Building. The construction companies found that the Mohawk ironworkers did not fear heights or dangerous conditions. Their contracts offered lower than average wages to the First Nations people and limited labor union membership. About 10% of all ironworkers in the New York area are Mohawks, down from about 15% earlier in the 20th century.

The work and home life of Mohawk ironworkers was documented in Don Owen's 1965 National Film Board of Canada documentary High Steel. The Mohawk community that formed in a compact area of Brooklyn, which they called "Little Caughnawaga", after their homeland, is documented in Reaghan Tarbell's Little Caughnawaga: To Brooklyn and Back, shown on PBS in 2008. This community was most active from the 1920s to the 1960s. The families accompanied the men, who were mostly from Kahnawake; together they would return to Kahnawake during the summer. Tarbell is from Kahnawake and was working as a film curator at the George Gustav Heye Center of the National Museum of the American Indian, located in the former Custom House in Lower Manhattan.

Since the mid-20th century, Mohawks have also formed their own construction companies. Others returned to New York projects. Mohawk skywalkers had built the World Trade Center buildings that were destroyed during the September 11 attacks, helped rescue people from the burning towers in 2001, and helped dismantle the remains of the building afterwards. Approximately 200 Mohawk ironworkers (out of 2,000 total ironworkers at the site) participated in rebuilding the One World Trade Center in Lower Manhattan. They typically drive the 360 miles from the Kahnawake reserve on the St. Lawrence River in Quebec to work the week in lower Manhattan and then return on the weekend to be with their families. A selection of portraits of these Mohawk ironworkers were featured in an online photo essay for Time magazine in September 2012.

== Contemporary issues ==
=== Gambling ===
Both the elected chiefs and the Warrior Society have encouraged gaming as a means of ensuring tribal self-sufficiency on the various reserves or Indian reservations. Traditional chiefs have tended to oppose gaming on moral grounds and out of fear of corruption and organized crime. Such disputes have also been associated with religious divisions: the traditional chiefs are often associated with the Longhouse tradition, practicing consensus-democratic values, while the Warrior Society has attacked that religion and asserted independence. Meanwhile, the elected chiefs have tended to be associated (though in a much looser and general way) with democratic, legislative and Canadian governmental values. The dispute turned into a violent feud in 1990 in what has been called the Mohawk Civil War in Akwesasne.

On October 15, 1993, Governor Mario Cuomo entered into the "Tribal-State Compact Between the St. Regis Mohawk First Nation and the State of New York". The compact allowed the Indigenous people to conduct gambling, including games such as baccarat, blackjack, craps and roulette, on the Akwesasne Reservation in Franklin County under the Indian Gaming Regulatory Act (IGRA). According to the terms of the 1993 compact, the New York State Racing and Wagering Board, the New York State Police and the St. Regis Mohawk Tribal Gaming Commission were vested with gaming oversight. Law enforcement responsibilities fell under the state police, with some law enforcement matters left to the community. As required by IGRA, the compact was approved by the United States Department of the Interior before it took effect. There were several extensions and amendments to this compact, but not all of them were approved by the U.S. Department of the Interior.

On June 12, 2003, the New York Court of Appeals affirmed the lower courts' rulings that Governor Cuomo exceeded his authority by entering into the compact absent legislative authorization and declared the compact void. On October 19, 2004, Governor George Pataki signed a bill passed by the State Legislature that ratified the compact as being nunc pro tunc, with some additional minor changes.

In 2008 the Mohawk Nation was working to obtain approval to own and operate a casino in Sullivan County, New York, at Monticello Raceway. The U.S. Department of the Interior disapproved this action although the Mohawks gained Governor Eliot Spitzer's concurrence, subject to the negotiation and approval of either an amendment to the current compact or a new compact. Interior rejected the Mohawks' application to take this land into trust.

In the early 21st century, two legal cases were pending that related to Native American gambling and land claims in New York. The State of New York has expressed similar objections to the Dept. of Interior taking other land into trust for federally recognized 'tribes', which would establish the land as sovereign Native American territory, on which they might establish new gaming facilities. The other suit contends that the Indian Gaming Regulatory Act violates the Tenth Amendment to the United States Constitution as it is applied in the State of New York. In 2010 it was pending in the United States District Court for the Western District of New York.

== Culture ==
=== Social organization ===
The main structures of social organization are the clans (kenʼtaraʼokòn꞉ʼa). The number of clans vary among the Haudenosaunee; the Mohawk have three: Bear (Ohkwa:ri), Turtle (Aʼnó꞉wara), and Wolf (Okwaho), divided into a Bear and Wolf-Turle moiety. Clans are nominally the descendants of a single female ancestor, with women possessing the leading role as Clan Mothers. Each member of the same clan, across all the Six Nations, is considered a relative. Traditionally, marriages between people of the same clan are forbidden. (Note: "Within certain clans there may also be different types of one animal or bird. For example, the turtle clan has three different types of turtles, the wolf clan has three different types of wolves and the bear clan includes three different types of bears allowing for marriage within the clan as long as each belongs to a different species of the clan.") Children belong to their mother's clan.

The Mohawk traditionally dwelt in palisaded towns, as well as smaller hamlets and seasonal hunting/fishing camps. Towns were centered on the longhouse and contained 30-150 longhouses. Towns moved every 15-20 years as nearby resources were depleted.

Each town was governed by a council of chiefs selected by the Clan Mothers and organized along clan lines, with the Bear (Note: Some sources say Turtle) Clan chiefs serving as Firekeepers. Village councils mirrored the structure of the traditional Mohawk Nation Council, which consists of nine Rotiyanehson, three from each of the three clans, and serves as a national Mohawk government. Those nine Rotiyanehson in turn represent the Mohawk at the Haudenosaunee Grand Council, where they serve are part of the Elder Brother moiety alongside the Seneca people.

=== Religion ===
Traditional Mohawk religion is mostly Animist. "Much of the religion is based on a primordial conflict between good and evil." Many Mohawks continue to follow traditional Haudenosaunee religion or the Longhouse Religion.

In 1632 a band of Jesuit missionaries now known as the Canadian Martyrs led by Isaac Jogues was captured by a party of Mohawks and brought to Ossernenon (now Auriesville, New York). Jogues and company attempted to convert the Mohawks to Catholicism, but the Mohawks took them captive, tortured, abused and killed them. Following their martyrdom, new French Jesuit missionaries arrived and many Mohawks were baptized into the Catholic faith. Ten years after Jogues' death, Kateri Tekakwitha, the daughter of a Mohawk chief and Tagaskouita, a Roman Catholic Algonquin woman, was born in Ossernenon and later was canonized as the first Native American saint. Religion became a tool of conflict between the French and British in Mohawk country. The Reformed clergyman Godfridius Dellius also preached among the Mohawks.

=== Traditional attire ===
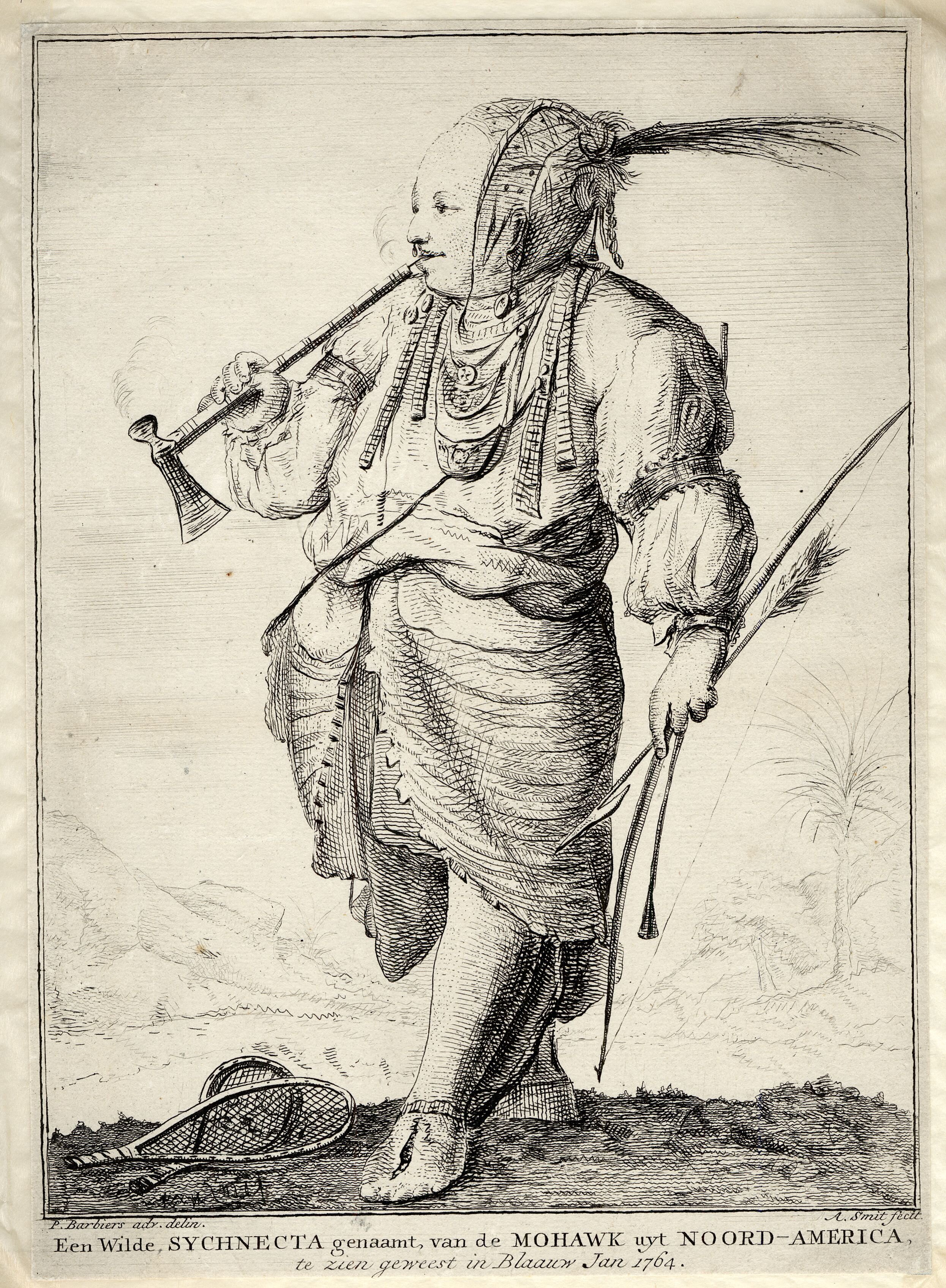
Mohawk named Sychnecta, 1764

Historically, the traditional hairstyle of Mohawk men, and many men of the other groups of the Haudenosaunee Confederacy, was to remove most of the hair from the head by plucking (not shaving) tuft by tuft of hair until all that was left was a smaller section, that was worn in a variety of styles, which could vary by community. The women wore their hair long, often dressed with traditional bear grease (kén:ieh), or tied back into a single braid (onyátshaʼ or oratskòn:taʼ).

In traditional dress women often went topless in summer and wore a skirt (aʼwháhsaʼ / oʼwháhshaʼ) of deerskin (oskenón:ton kanéhon). In colder seasons, women wore a deerskin dress (atyà:tawiʼ). Men wore a breech cloth of deerskin in summer. In cooler weather, they added deerskin leggings (iontsinoróksa), a deerskin shirt (atyà:tawiʼ), arm (atenentshánhaʼ) and knee bands, and carried a quill and flint arrow hunting bag. Women and men wore puckered-seam, ankle-wrap moccasins (ahtahkwa'ón:we) with earrings (ateʼwáhsareʼ) and necklaces (yennihtyà:ksthaʼ) made of shells. Jewelry was also created using porcupine quills (ó:nahs), such as wampum belts. For headwear, the men would use a piece of animal fur with attached porcupine quills and features. The women would occasionally wear tiaras of beaded (tekatsinehtaráron) cloth. Following European contact, dress combined some cloth pieces such as wool (karisé:) trousers (atháhsterenʼ) and skirts.

=== Marriage ===
The Mohawk Nation people have a matrilineal kinship system, with descent and inheritance passed through the female line. Today, the marriage ceremony may follow that of the old tradition or incorporate newer elements, but is still used by many Mohawk Nation marrying couples. Some couples choose to marry in the European manner and the Longhouse manner, with the Longhouse ceremony usually held first.

== Language ==
The Mohawk language or Kanien'kéha is a Northern Iroquoian language. Like many other Indigenous languages of the Americas, Mohawk is a polysynthetic language. Its orthography in the Latin script was standardized in 1993 at the Mohawk Language Standardization Conference.

== Governments ==
Mohawk are organized into Tribes in the United States and First Nations Band governments in Canada:

- New York:
  - St. Regis Mohawk Tribe (Ahkwesáhsne) (population shared with Akwesasne).
- Quebec:
  - Mohawk Nation at Akwesasne (Ahkwesáhsne)
  - Mohawks of Kahnawà:ke (Kahnawákeró꞉non)
  - Mohawks of Kanesatake (Kanehsata'kehró:non)
- Ontario:
  - Mohawks of the Bay of Quinte First Nation (Kenhtè꞉ke Kanyen'kehà꞉ka)
  - Six Nations of the Grand River (Yá:ya'k Niyononhwentsyò:ten ne Kenhionhata:tie Ó:se) (multiple band governments)
    - Lower Mohawk First Nation
    - Upper Mohawk First Nation
    - Walker Mohawk First Nation

== Settlements ==
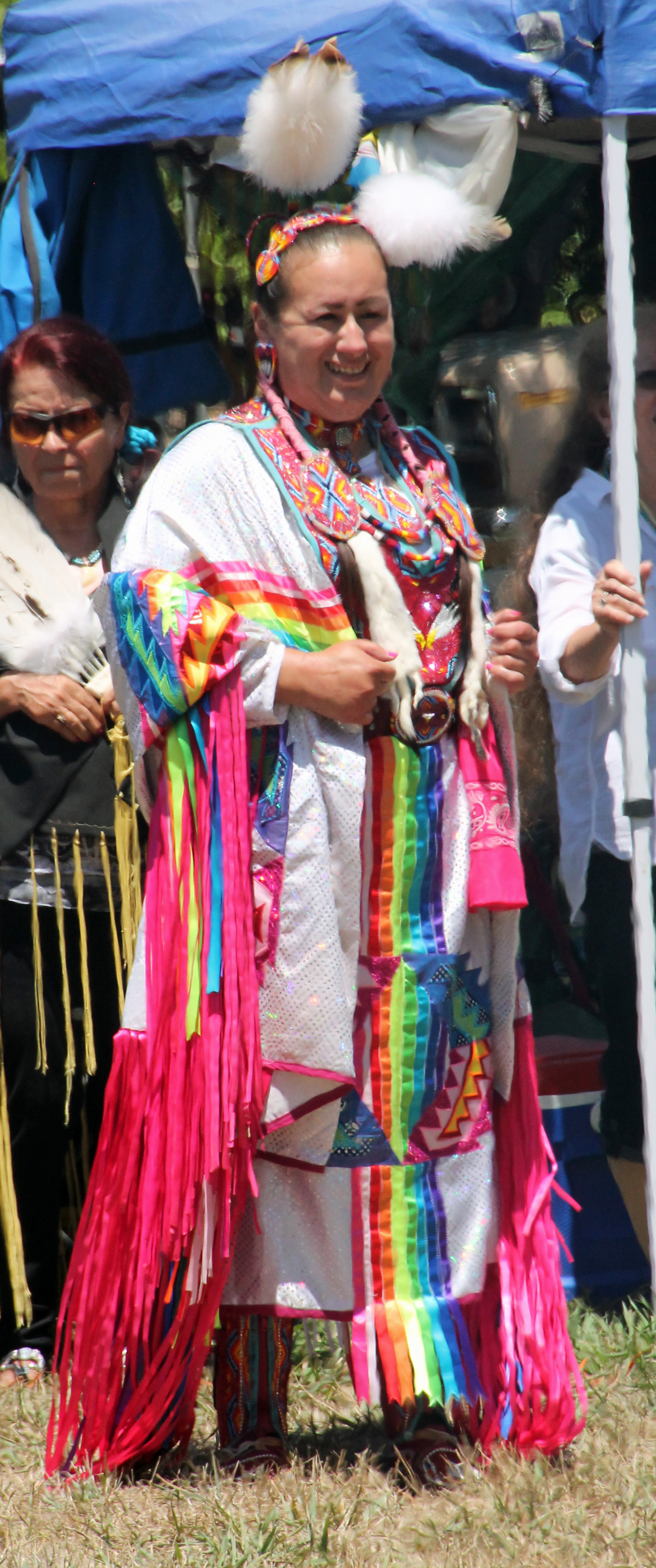
Kanienʼkehá꞉ka dancer at a powwow in 2015

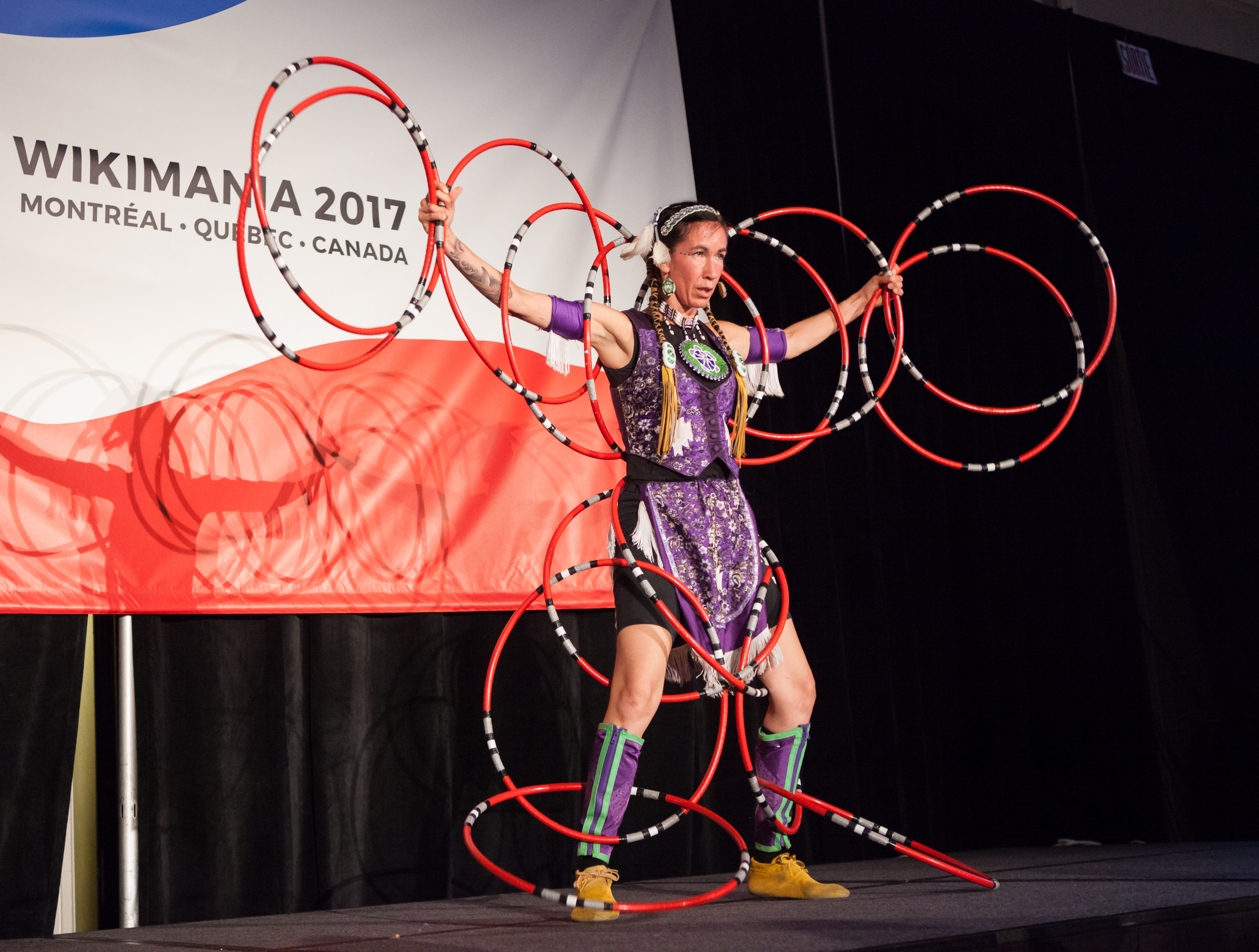
Contemporary Quebec Kanienʼkehá꞉ka person performing a hoop dance at Wikimania 2017

Members of the Kanienʼkehá꞉ka people now live in sovereign settlements in northern New York State and southeastern Canada.

Contemporary Mohawk communities

Many Kanienʼkehá꞉ka communities have two sets of chiefs, who are in some sense competing governmental rivals. One group are the hereditary chiefs (royaner), nominated by Clan Mother matriarchs in the traditional Mohawk fashion. The Mohawk of most of the reserves have established governments based on constitutions and elected chiefs and councilors. The Canadian and U.S. governments usually prefer to deal exclusively with the elected representatives.

The self-governing communities are listed below, grouped by broad geographical cluster, with notes on the character of community governance found in each.

- Northern New York:
  - Kanièn꞉ke (Ganienkeh) "Place of the flint". Traditional governance.
  - Kanaʼtsioharè꞉ke "Place of the washed pail". Traditional governance.
- Along the St Lawrence in Quebec:
  - Ahkwesáhsne (St. Regis, New York and Quebec/Ontario, Canada) "Where the partridge drums". Traditional governance, and band/tribal elections.
  - Kahnawà꞉ke (south of Montréal) "On the rapids". Canada, traditional governance, and band/tribal elections.
  - Kanehsatà꞉ke (Oka) "Where the snow crust is". Canada, traditional governance, and band/tribal elections.
  - Tioweró꞉ton (Sainte-Lucie-des-Laurentides, Quebec). Canada, shared governance between Kahnawà꞉ke and Kanehsatà꞉ke.
- Southern Ontario:
  - Kenhtè꞉ke (Tyendinaga) "On the bay". Traditional governance, and band/tribal elections.
  - Wáhta (Gibson) "Maple tree". Traditional governance, and band/tribal elections.
  - Ohswé꞉ken "Six Nations of the Grand River". Traditional governance, and band/tribal elections. The Mohawk form the majority of the population of this Haudenosaunee Six Nations reserve. There are also Mohawk Orange Lodges in Canada.

Increased activism for land claims, a rise in tribal revenues due to establishment of gaming on certain reserves or reservations, competing leadership, traditional government jurisdiction, issues of taxation, and the Canadian Indian Act have contributed to a rise in considerable internal conflict within the reserves and communities since the late 20th century.

=== Longhouses ===
Replicas of 17th-century longhouses have been built at landmarks and tourist villages, such as Kanata Village, Brantford, Ontario, and Akwesasne's "Tsiionhiakwatha" interpretation village. Other Mohawk Nation Longhouses are found on the Mohawk territory reserves that hold the Mohawk law recitations, ceremonial rites, and Longhouse Religion (or "Code of Handsome Lake"). These include:

- Ohswé꞉ken (Six Nations) First Nation Territory, Ontario holds six Ceremonial Mohawk Community Longhouses.
- Wáhta First Nation Territory, Ontario holds one Ceremonial Mohawk Community Longhouse.
- Kenhtè꞉ke (Tyendinaga) First Nation Territory, Ontario holds one Ceremonial Mohawk Community Longhouse.
- Ahkwesásne First Nation Territory, which straddles the borders of Quebec, Ontario and New York, holds two Mohawk Ceremonial Community Longhouses.
- Kaʼnehsatà꞉ke First Nation Territory, Quebec holds one Ceremonial Mohawk Community Longhouse.
- Kahnawà꞉ke First Nation Territory, Quebec holds three Ceremonial Mohawk Community Longhouses.
- Kanièn꞉ke First Nation Territory, New York State holds one Ceremonial Mohawk Community Longhouse.
- Kanaʼtsioharà꞉ke First Nation Territory, New York State holds one Ceremonial Mohawk Community Longhouse.

== Notable historical Mohawk ==
These are notable historical Mohawk people. Contemporary people can be found under their modern First Nation or tribe.

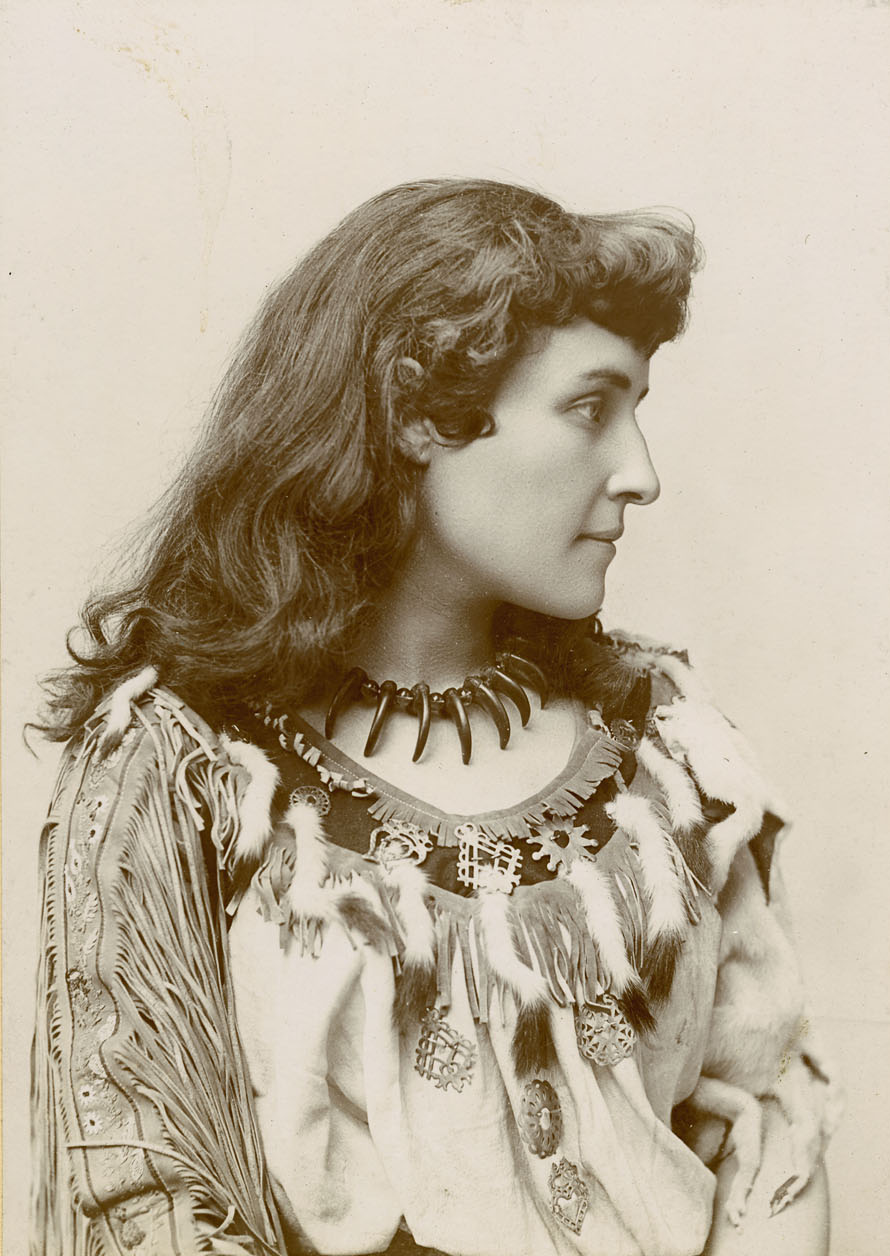
E. Pauline Johnson, Tekahionwake (1861–1913), poet, author, and public speaker from the Six Nations Reserve of the Grand River

- Joseph Brant or Thayendanegea (1743–1771), Mohawk leader, British officer, brother of Molly Brant
- Molly Brant or Degonwadonti (c. 1736 – 1796), Mohawk leader, sister of Joseph Brant
- Canaqueese (17th century), Mohawk war chief and diplomat from the Ohio Valley
- Esther Louise Georgette Deer or Princess White Deer (1891–1992), Kahnawá꞉ke Mohawk dancer and singer
- John Deseronto or Odeserundiye (c. 1745 – 1811), Tyendinaga Mohawk chief
- Hiawatha (c. 12th century), precontact Mohawk chief and cofounder of the Haudenosaunee Confederacy
- Karonghyontye or Captain David Hill (1745–1790), Mohawk leader during the American Revolutionary War
- E. Pauline Johnson or Tekahionwake (1861–1913), poet, author, and public speaker from the Six Nations Reserve of the Grand River
- George Henry Martin Johnson or Onwanonsyshon (1816–1884), Mohawk chief and interpreter
- John Norton or Teyoninhokarawen (c. 1770 – c. 1827), Scottish born, adopted into the Mohawk First Nation and made an honorary "Pine Tree Chief"
- Oronhyatekha (1841–1907), physician, scholar from Six Nations of the Grand River
- Ots-Toch (1600 – c. 1640), wife of Dutch colonist Cornelius A. Van Slyck
- Hendrick Tejonihokarawa (c. 1660 – c. 1735), Mohawk chief of the Wolf clan; one of the four kings to visit England to see Queen Anne to ask for help fighting the French
- St. Kateri Tekakwitha (Mohawk/Algonquin, 1656–1680), "Lily of the Mohawks", Roman Catholic saint
- Black Hawk, lacrosse player

Late 20th and 21st-century Mohawk people are listed under their specific First Nation or tribe at:

- Akwesasne (St. Regis)
- Bay of Quinte
- Grand River Six Nations
- Kahnawake
- Kanehsatà꞉ke

== See also ==
- Haudenosaunee Confederacy
- Iroquoian languages
- Kahnawake surnames
- Mohawk language
- Native Americans in the United States
- Native American tribe
- Oka Crisis
- The Flying Head

== Bibliography ==
- Snow, Dean R. (1994). The Iroquois. Boston: Blackwell Publishers. ISBN 1-55786-938-3.
- Dean R. Snow; William A. Starna; Charles T. Gehring, eds. (1996). In Mohawk Country: Early Narratives about a Native People. Syracuse University Press. ISBN 9780815604105.
