= Little Abraham =

Mohawk leader

Little Abraham or Tyorhansera (Mohawk: Teiorhénhsereʼ) was a Mohawk Chief who was best known for his neutral stance regarding the Revolutionary War. This was because he believed that neither side was trustworthy.

Little Abraham’s date of birth is unknown, but he died in 1780 in prison after being arrested by Guy Johnson in 1780. The Revolutionary War took place between 1775 and 1783.

Little Abraham lived in a town called Tiononderoge, in the Mohawk Nation, which is a part of the Haudenosaunee Confederacy. Little Abraham was a Pine Tree Chief and a member of the Wolf Clan. Pine Tree Chiefs are people who prove themself to be worthy of being in the grand council of the Haudenosaunee Confederacy, and cannot pass their position hereditarily.
