= Karoniaktajeh Louis Hall =

First Nations artist

Karoniaktajeh Louis Hall (January 15, 1918 – December 9, 1993) was a Mohawk artist, writer and activist of the Kahnawake Mohawk Territory. He is most widely known for his design of the "Mohawk Warrior Flag", also known as the "Unity Flag", that was used as a symbol of resistance by the Rotisken’rakéhte, or Mohawk Warrior Society, in the 1990 Oka Crisis. Hall is known for being a strong participant in the reviving of Haudenosaunee (Iroquois) spiritual traditions and Kanonsiononwe (Longhouse) culture. Hall was an expert on the Kaianera'kó:wa or Great Law of Peace, the Haudenosaunee constitution, and was a pivotal part of the establishment of the Ganienkeh Mohawk Territory.

== Activism and art practice ==
"Mohawk Warrior Flag" designed by Karoniaktajeh Louis Hall

Hall was one of the first accomplished Indigenous American artists of the 20th century that had an explicitly political artistic practice. Hall was a self-taught painter and was a notable artist among the "Red Power" Movement. His work had elements of traditional painting, political propaganda, and graphic design. In addition to his visual practice, Hall also published newsletters and books, including A Tale of One Mohawk, The Warriors' Handbook, Rebuilding the Iroquois Confederacy, and The Mohawk Warrior Society: A Handbook on Sovereignty and Survival. Apart from the 1990 "Mohawk Warrior Flag", Hall's work has not been shown in any galleries or museums.

Hall joined the American Indian Movement (AIM), and designed a poster for them in 1973. AIM was a civil rights organization formed by people of the First Nations of the United States and Canada. This movement sought to challenge and fight the oppressive forces placed upon Native North Americans. Hall participated in roles on all levels in AIM, and it is here that he fought to bring back the traditional government and Longhouse ideas back to the Kahnawake.

Prior to the Oka Crisis, Hall was involved in the repossession of traditional Ganienkeh territory in New York State in 1974. Here, Hall stood as the corresponding secretary and spokesman of the Moss Lake Council. The Native Americans claimed that the Ganienkeh Territory stretched more than 9 million acres from New York to Vermont, and that the land had been illegally taken from them in 1797. This is when the first version of the "Unity Flag" was created by Hall. It depicts a longhaired Native male's silhouette with a red and white sunburst behind him. Hall has said that the flag is "Designed for all Indian nations. Single feather means ‘all of one mind.’ Deganawida wanted all Indians to be under the Great Law of Peace. Equality for all Indian nations.” Deganawida, also called The Great Peace Maker, was the founder of the Haudenosaunee Confederacy.

The newer and more widely known "Unity Flag" was designed by Hall during the 1990 Oka Crisis and was used as a symbol of resistance at blockades in both Kanesatake and Kahnawake territories. This new iteration of the flag replaced the previous longhaired man, with a Kanien’kehá:ka warrior. In contrast to the prior flag, which was a symbol for all Indigenous Americans, this flag was specifically made for the Rotisken’rakéhte, or Mohawk Warrior Society. This flag has been described by Hall as a visual manifestation of the Kaianera'kó:wa (Great Law of Peace).

== Death and legacy ==
Louis Karoniaktajeh Hall died on December 9, 1993, at age 76. He was in his home in the Mohawk community of Kahnawake at the time of death.

The artistic practice and political activism of Hall is remembered and still lives on today. The "Unity Flag" has become an iconic symbol of peace and resistance, and has been mass-produced in the form of stickers, key chains, clothing and banners. The "Unity Flag" has also been used in more contemporary civil rights settings. During the Esgenoôpetitj "fishing dispute" between 1999 and 2002, the Mi'kmaq people flew the "Unity Flag", defending their right to fish, harvest, and hunt their nation's natural resources. The flag was also seen at demonstrations at Standing Rock, rallies during Idle No More and Black Lives Matter protests, and in Nablus, Palestine during the Gaza war.
