= Mohawk Warrior Society =

Mohawk group

"Mohawk Warrior Flag" designed by Karoniaktajeh Louis Hall, used between 1974 and 2016

The Rotisken’rakéhte, known in English as the Mohawk Warrior Society (Mohawk pronunciation: [rodisgʌ̃ʔraˈgɛ́hdɛ]) and the Kahnawake Warrior Society, is a Mohawk group united around the care, preservation and defence of the Mohawk people and their land. In 1972, the Council of Chiefs at Kahnawake authorized its formation as the Kahnawake Warrior Society to carry out Council resolutions and perform national defense and public security functions within the territory. Responsibilities and actions range from chopping wood for elder community members to erecting roadblocks or initiating evictions and occupations.

Rotisken’rakéhte represent one part of decentralized indigenous governance under the Great Law of Peace (Mohawk: Kaianere’kó:wa) and similar groups to the Mohawk Warrior Society exist for all peoples of the Haudenosaunee Confederacy. Rather than formal organization, the group represents the duties of Mohawk men within traditional society and as practitioners of the Great Law of peace. The current form of the society was rekindled in the late 1960s after decades of colonial assimilation efforts disrupted traditional Mohawk methods of governance and organization. It gained notoriety in 1973 when they, along with American Indian Movement activists, held a standoff with the Quebec Provincial Police at Kahnawake, and another in Kanehsatake in 1990. The members of this society are known as Warriors.

== Flag ==
The Mohawk Warrior Flag was designed by Karoniaktajeh Louis Hall in 1974. Karoniaktajeh was an artist, writer, and activist from Kahnawake. The flag was initially called the "unity flag" or "Indian flag", depicting an Indigenous man with long hair over top a yellow sunburst and red banner representing the "Red Man". This was changed in the 1980s with the man being replaced with a Kanien’kehá:ka (Mohawk) warrior, and the sun reinterpreted to represent the Haudenosaunee concept of Ro’sken’rakehtekó:wa Tiohkehnéhkha Karáhkwa, the Elder Brother Sun. The flag was highlighted in the media during the Oka Crisis and became a symbol of resistance for Kanien’kehá:ka people.

== Gallery ==
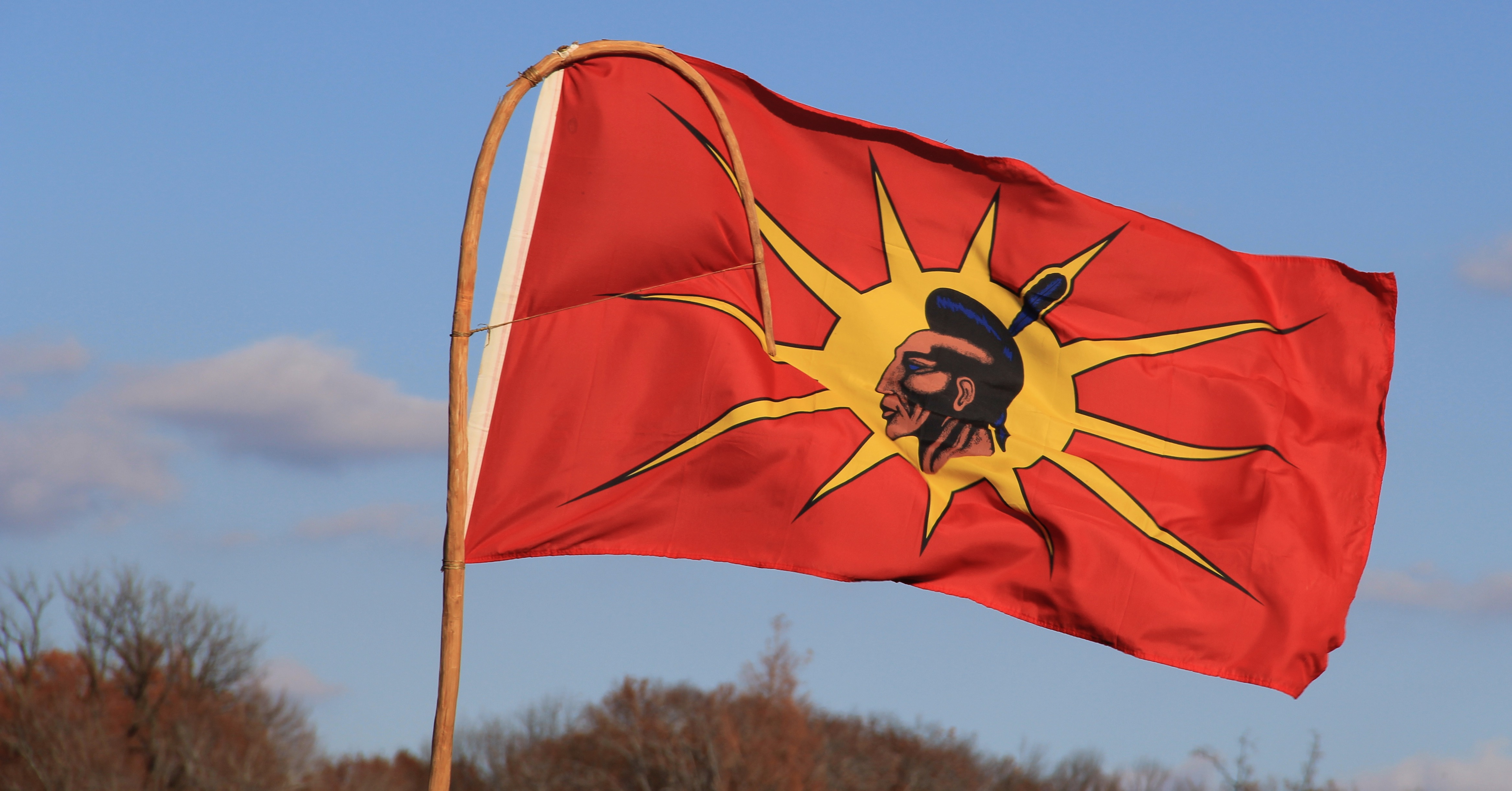
Mohawk Warrior Society flag at Beyond NoDAPL March on Washington, DC.

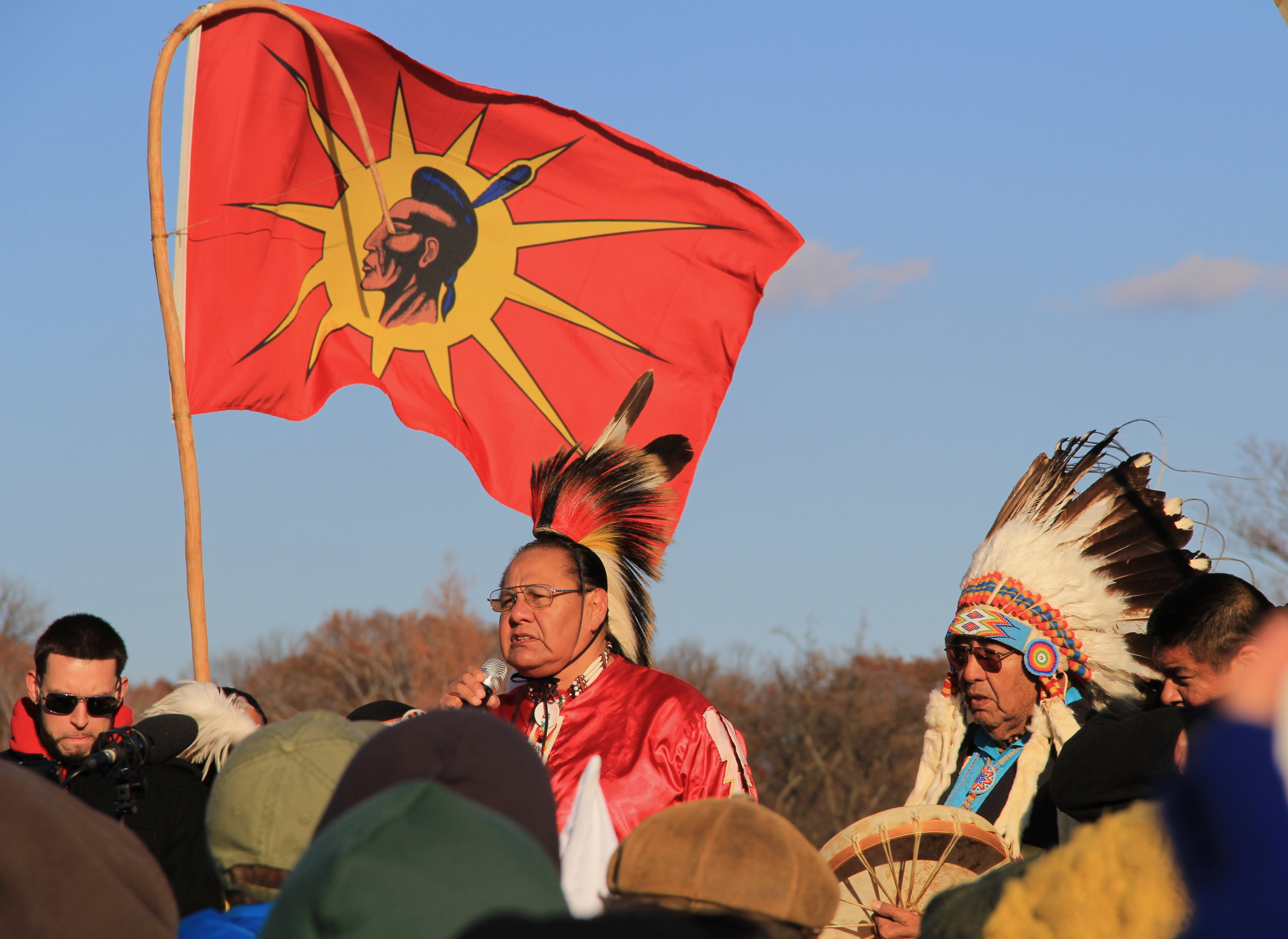
NoDAPL March on Washington, DC.

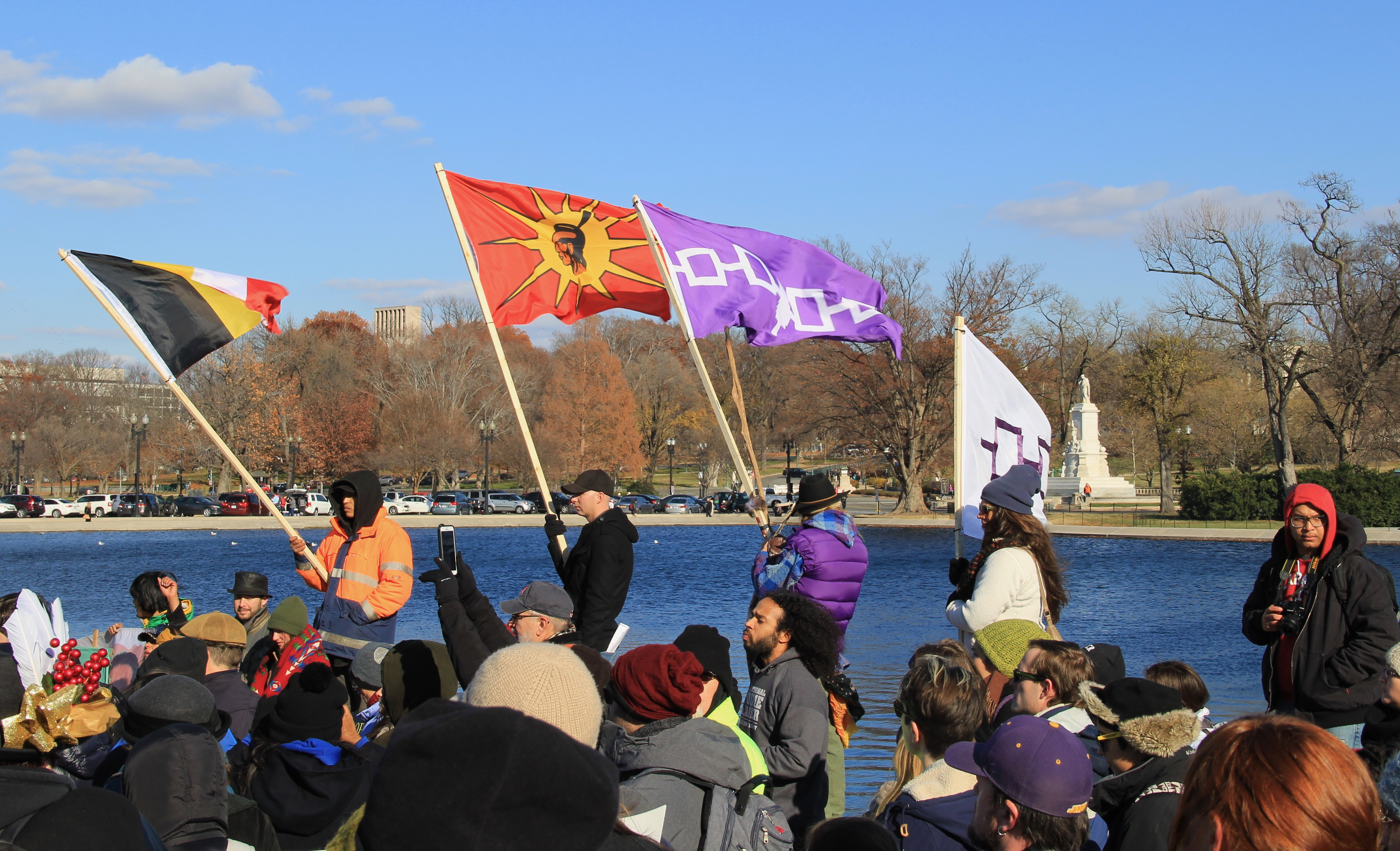
Brother of Leonard Peltier speaking at Standing Rock and Beyond NoDAPL March on Washington, DC.

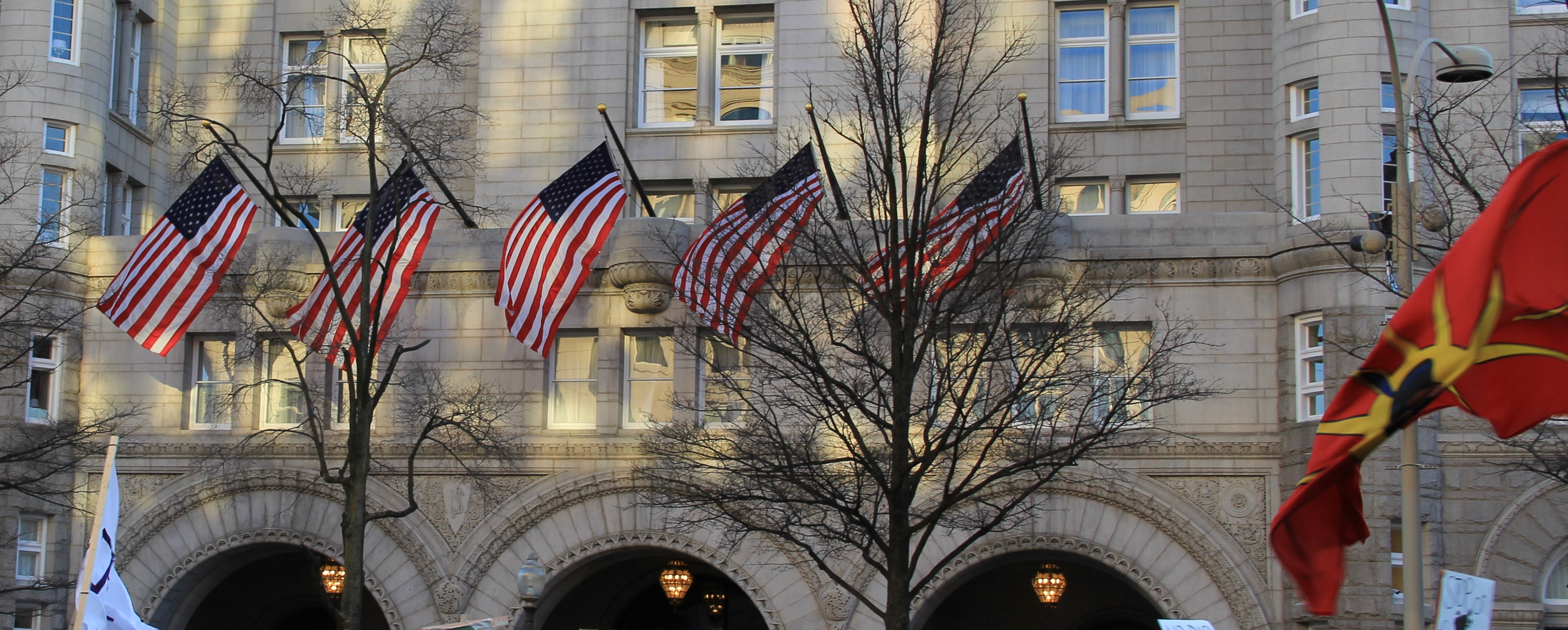
Beyond NoDAPL March on Washington, DC.
