= Ganienkeh =

Mohawk community near Altona, New York

Ganienkeh Kanièn:ke
- Permanent nonreservation settlement
- Flag

- Location within New York
- Coordinates: 44.86822°N 73.66977°W
- Country: United States
- State: New York
- County: Clinton County
- Established: 1977

Area
  - Total: 12 sq mi (30 km^{2})
- Time zone: UTC-5 (EST)
  - Summer (DST): UTC-4 (EDT)
- Area code: 518
- Website: http://www.ganienkeh.net

The Ganienkeh Territory (Kanièn:ke, meaning Land of the Flint in Mohawk) is a Mohawk community located on about 600 acres (2.4 km^{2}) near Altona, New York in the far northeast corner of the North Country. The community considers itself an "Independent North American Indian State". Established by an occupation of Mohawk warriors in the late 1970s, it is a rare case in which an Indigenous people reclaimed land from the United States via secession. Issues of sovereignty and governmental relations have not been settled.

== History ==
=== Origins ===
In May 1974, traditionalist Mohawks repossessed land near Old Forge, New York, occupying Moss Lake, a girl's camp. They claimed the land under the concept that it had been part of their historic territory in the area, and that New York had made an illegal treaty in 1797 when purchasing land from their leader Joseph Brant. In their manifesto, compiled by Louis Karoniaktajeh Hall, it is stated that "Mohawk Land was lost in an earlier century by fraud and its possession by New York State and the State of Vermont constitute illegal usurpation. No deed signed by Joseph Brant and the New York State agent can extinguish the rights of the Mohawks to their own country. The native North Americans not only have the rights but are duty bound to correct the wrong committed by Joseph Brant and the New York State agents against the Mohawk Nation." Copies of the manifesto were sent to the United Nations and to President Richard Nixon.

These Mohawk had left the Akwesasne, Kahnawake, and other reservations to rebuild traditional lives. The land dispute (as Altona residents and government objected to the Mohawk claim of sovereignty) has not been fully settled. The action was related to rising Native American activism, and specific land claims being filed against New York State by separate nations of the Iroquois. As allies of the defeated British, they had been forced to cede their historic lands to the state after the American Revolution, but the US Senate had never ratified the treaty, making it invalid under the constitution. Some believe that the 1794 Treaty of Canandaigua give the Iroquois nations continuing rights to land in the present-day state. The Oneida won a lands claim case, and others continued in negotiation in the late 20th century.

At the same time, the founding of Ganienkeh was related to Mohawk local issues, as some families wanted to leave the reservation environment. They found it had problems with alcohol and substance abuse, among other issues.

=== Settlement at Miner Lake ===
The three-year armed occupation of the camp ended in 1977 after nearly 200 negotiation sessions with New York state leaders. The Mohawk agreed to move to territory at Miner Lake that was initially designated as a State Park, which was offered by New York State through an intermediary trust. Unlike at the ten reservations within the borders of the state, in which federally recognized tribes have a relation with the federal government and the state has no authority over them, the jurisdictional relationships between the tribe and New York have not been defined at this territory.

This became the settlement of Ganienkeh, about 12 miles (19 km) from the Canada–US border. The local townspeople helped supply them with food and other necessities during the first winter as they were allowed to take nothing but their personal property. The initial settlement was poor and the society was committed to forming a non-monetary economy. Buildings were constructed out of remnants taken from Moss Lake, and they were not furnished with electricity or running water. Revenue from the sale of tax-free cigarettes allowed for further development of the community.

The Mohawk established a "permanent nonreservation settlement" and claimed sovereign status. Ganienkeh's founding was stated to be "a rare case of Indigenous people reclaiming land from the United States." Ganienkeh spokespeople state it is the only Kanienkehaka (Mohawk Nation) community that functions solely under the original Kaianerehkowa (the Constitution of the Iroquois Confederacy) without influence or interference of the United States or Canadian governments. The people claim that the Two Row Wampum (Guswhenta) guarantees Ganienkeh the right to exist as a sovereign entity within the international community. They note that as a sovereign people they may not be taxed by New York or the federal government.

By 1990, the Mohawk still prohibited outsiders from entering the territory. That year, a doctor aboard a Vermont National Guard helicopter was wounded after the aircraft was struck by a rifle bullet. It was determined the shot came from the area in or around Ganienkeh. When state police arrived at the community to investigate, it triggered an 11 day armed standoff with residents. The investigation was eventually allowed to proceed, but no arrests were made. The tribe's own police force has continued to remove interlopers.

== Legal land rights ==
The land occupied by the tribe around Miner Lake is technically leased through the State of New York. Mario Cuomo set up the Turtle Island Trust, an agency established to handle the lease. The original area leased was approximately 5,700 acres. Since the settlement, the community has acquired over 1,700 additional acres of property through the Trust. The lease agreement was upheld after a lawsuit by the Altona Citizens Committee attempted to have the lease voided. The lease was upheld by the Court of Appeals in 1981.

The original lease agreement expired in 1992, but continues to operate on a month-to-month basis. All the land the people of Ganienkeh purchased through the Turtle Island Trust is untaxed, as are all of their businesses.

In 2012, Clinton County auctioned off 11 parcels of land owned by the Turtle Island Trust. The county claimed they were owed upwards of $300,000 in back taxes, opting to foreclose the properties and put them up for sale. The Turtle Island Trust contested the sale and filed a lawsuit with the New York State Supreme Court. It was ruled in favor of Clinton County.

== Economy and operations ==
In 1990 Ganienkeh introduced tax-free bingo, with a 1,500-person hall. This activity has generated income which the community has invested in economic development projects. They also sell cigarettes tax free. They also opened the nine-hole Ganienkeh Golf Course, available to players for a fee.

These businesses are communally operated for the benefit of the Territory. Through regular convened community meetings, every resident of Ganienkeh may participate in the day-to-day government of the community. Ganienkeh is a dry community, prohibiting all recreational drugs and alcohol.

The tribe operates an unlicensed casino, which has caused controversy with county officials and proprietors of the licensed casino at Akwesasne.

== Education ==
The community runs the Rontewennanónhnha (lit. word-learning place), a school. The curriculum has an emphasis on teaching the Mohawk language to students, as well as passing down traditional knowledge.

== Flag ==
The "Ganienkeh Flag", also known as "The Mohawk Warrior Flag" or "The Unity Flag", is a flag that was designed by Mohawk artist Louis Karoniaktajeh Hall. It was first displayed during the 1974 occupation of Moss Lake, and was used as a symbol of "Indigenous unity, nationalism, and resistance". In one notable incident, a group of local residents stole the flag from the tribe and cut it into pieces.

The flag later became a symbol during the Oka Crisis, a land dispute between Mohawk people and the town of Oka in Quebec, Canada.

== See also ==
- Akwesasne
- Kahnawake
- Kanesatake
- Six Nations of the Grand River First Nation
