= Kanatsiohareke =

Kanienkahaka community

Coordinates: 42.9001345244652°N 74.49055019976284°W

Kanatsiohareke ([ɡanaʔd͡ʒɔhaˈɽɛːkɛ]; Mohawk: Kana’tsioharé:ke, lit. 'place of the clean pot') is a small Kanien'kehá:ka (Mohawk) community on the north bank of the Mohawk River, west of Fonda, New York in the traditional territory of the Kanien'kehá:ka. The name is derived from Canajoharie or "Upper Castle", one of the two major towns of the Mohawk nation in 1738.

Kanatsiohareke was founded to be a "Carlisle Indian Boarding School in Reverse", and emphasizes teaching of Mohawk language and culture. Located at the ancient homeland of the Kanienkehaka (Mohawk), it was re-established in September 1993 under the leadership of Thomas R. Porter (Sakokwenionkwas - "The One Who Wins"). The community must raise their own revenue. It frequently holds cultural presentations, workshops, and academic events, including an annual Strawberry Festival. A craft shop on site features genuine handmade Native crafts from all over Turtle Island (North America).

The primary mission of the community is to try to preserve traditional values, culture, language and lifestyles in the guidance of the Kaienerekowa (Great Law of Peace). Kanatsiohareke, Inc. is a non-profit organization under IRS code 501c3. The community attempts to re-establish a Mohawk presence in the valley after a previous attempt in 1958 was driven out by local farmers.
