= Elisabeth Tooker =

American anthropologist (1927–2005)

- Born: August 2, 1927; Brooklyn, New York, U.S.
- Died: January 13, 2005 (aged 77); Philadelphia, Pennsylvania, U.S.

Academic background
- Education: Radcliffe College
- Thesis: Ritual, Power and the Supernatural: A Comparative Study of Indian Religions in Southwestern United States (1958)

Elisabeth Jane Tooker (August 2, 1927 – January 13, 2005) was an American anthropologist and a leading historian on the Haudenosaunee nations in Northeastern United States.

== Family ==
Elisabeth Jane Tooker was born on August 2, 1927, in Brooklyn, New York, to Amy (née Luce), a social worker and teacher, and Clyde Tooker, a lawyer.

== Education and career ==
Tooker served as a Teaching Fellow at Harvard University from 1956 to 1957. In 1957, she served as an instructor at the State University of New York at Buffalo.

She received a bachelor's and doctorate from Radcliffe College in 1949 and 1958, respectively, and a master's from the University of Arizona in 1953. Her PhD dissertation was titled Ritual, Power and the Supernatural: A Comparative Study of Indian Religions in Southwestern United States.

Before completing her degree at Radcliffe, Tooker was employed as a Teaching Fellow at Harvard from 1956 to 1957, and in 1957, she accepted a position as instructor at the State University of New York at Buffalo.

Tooker taught history at the University at Buffalo, Mount Holyoke College, and Temple University, where she spent most of her career.

Tooker was Professor Emerita of Anthropology, Temple University, Philadelphia, where she spent the remainder her career. While at Temple she was promoted to associate professor in 1967 and Professor in 1977.

Tooker's research focused on the Haudenosaunee (Iroquois). She did field research with Seneca people in Tonawanda, New York, and published on topics including Haudenosaunee religion.

Tooker belonged to a number of professional anthropological organizations, which include the American Ethnological Society, where she served as editor of American Ethnologist, 1978–1982; the American Society for Ethnohistory. From 1981 to 1982 she was President of the Conference on Iroquois Research From 1966 to 1968 she served at the Northeastern Anthropological Association as Secretary, In 1967 Vice President of the Philadelphia Anthropological Society and President in 1967. Her extensive involvement in anthropology has earned recognition as a Fellow of the American Association for the Advancement of Science. She was also an alumna member of Phi Beta Kappa at Radcliffe College, 1974. She was awarded the Cornplanter Medal for Iroquois Research in 1986.

Tooker died at the age of 77 on January 13, 2005, in Philadelphia, Pennsylvania.

== Selected works ==
- An Ethnography of the Huron Indians, 1615–1649 (1964)
- The Iroquois Ceremonial of Midwinter (1970)
- Tooker, Elisabeth (February 1970). "Northern Iroquoian Sociopolitical Organization". American Anthropologist. New Series. 72 (1): 90–97. doi:10.1525/aa.1970.72.1.02a00110. JSTOR 670758.
- The Indians of the Northeast: A Critical Bibliography (1978)
- Native North American Spirituality of the Eastern Woodlands: Sacred Myths, Dreams, Visions, Speeches, Healing Formulas, Rituals and Ceremonials (1979)
- Ethnographie des Hurons, 1615-1649. Montréal : Recherches amérindiennes au Québec. 1987. ISBN 9782920366060.
- "The United States Constitution and the Iroquois League". Ethnohistory. 35 (4): 305–336. 1988. doi:10.2307/482139. JSTOR 482139.
- Lewis H. Morgan on Iroquois Material Culture (1994)
- Hewitt, John Napoleon Brinton (1859–1937), ethnologist and linguist. Vol. 1. Oxford University Press. 1999. doi:10.1093/anb/9780198606697.article.2001490.

== See also ==
- Dean Snow – American archeologist and American historian of the Haudenosaunee nations
- William A. Starna – American archeologist and historian of the Mohawk and Haudenosaunee

== Sources ==
- "Elisabeth Tooker Papers". American Philosophical Society Library.
