= Kanata Village =

Tourist attraction in Brantford, Ontario

Coordinates: 43.1285°N 80.2325°W

Kanata Village was a tourist attraction in Brantford, Ontario made by the Pine Tree Native Centre. It was an attraction meant to give “The 17th century Iroquois experience.” There is a longhouse and while it was active, there were various demonstrations of 17th century Iroquois life such as “making fire by friction, tanning hides, pounding corn, and playing First Nations games like double ball and snow snake.”

Kanata Village opened in 2000 and was considered the best new attraction in Ontario that year. On May 8, 2003, fires were set in the village by arsonists and the longhouse was destroyed. It was then repaired and reopened in February 2004. It closed in 2005 when the Pine Tree Native Centre closed down. It was later occupied by Mohawk Workers around 2007 because they saw that Kanata Village was making payments to the city when they believed that the land was never given to the city. In 2012, the Brantford City Council tried to evict the workers occupying Kanata Village by not letting them receive utility bills so they would no longer receive utilities. However, it did not cause the Mohawk Workers to leave.
