= Dean Snow =

American historian (born 1940)

Dean Richard Snow
- Born: October 18, 1940 (age 86)
- Occupation: Archeologist

Academic work
- Discipline: History
- Institutions: Pennsylvania State University

Dean Richard Snow (born October 18, 1940) is an archeologist and an American ethnohistorian who is Professor Emeritus of Anthropology at Pennsylvania State University who has conducted extensive archeological research on the Haudenosaunee (Iroquois) Indigenous nations of northeastern America, and other indigenous cultures in the highlands of Mexico, and in Spain and France. Snow specializes in ethnohistory and is considered an authority in this field. Snow has conducted archaeological field investigations along the Mohawk Valley and at the Saratoga battlefield. In 1977 he was asked by the U.S. Department of Justice to act as a historical consultant involving Indian land claims against the state of Maine. Snow was raised in Sleepy Eye, Minnesota. He married Janet Keller in 1963. They and their three adult children (see Kate Snow) later lived in the Saratoga region in upstate New York. Snow has written many books and journal articles on North American archeology, Indian nations and related subjects.

== Education ==
Snow received a B.A. from the University of Minnesota in 1962 and a Ph.D. from University of Oregon in 1966 where he gained field experience in the Midwest, Alaska, and Mexico. His doctoral dissertation was based on research carried out in the highlands of Mexico. From 2007 to 2009 he served as President of the Society for American Archaeology. In 1979 was elected president of the American Society for Ethnohistory.

== Career ==
Snow began his professional career in archeological research in 1966 at the University of Maine, and established the first university-based archaeological research program in the state of Maine. Thereafter he continued to pursue his career at the University at Albany, SUNY, in upstate New York, where he spent the next twenty-six years. During this time he served as Professor of Anthropology and Chair of the Department of Anthropology, and Associate Dean of the College of Social and Behavioral Sciences.

Snow is known for his research into the paleodemography of prehistoric populations in the highlands of Mexico, New England, New York and western Europe. His works include a new edition of Archaeology of Native North America, co-authored with Nancy Gonlin and Peter Siegel, published in 2019. Snow has conducted archeological explorations and research in northeastern United States, and in Spain and France.

While in New York Snow conducted archaeological field investigations and excavations for the Park Service at the Saratoga battlefield from 1972 to 1977 in preparation for the 1977 bicentennial of the battle. Under the supervision of Snow, archeological teams from the State University of New York, at Albany, conducted one of the first extensive mapping operations at any major historic battlefield in the United States. Snow relied heavily upon low altitude aerial photographs, covering an area of approximately ten square miles, from which he used to construct a series of base maps that outlined earthworks, roads, and hidden foundations of old structures that existed at the time of the battles. In order to verify the identify of the various structures Snow performed numerous archeological test excavations in and around the battlefield, and in the process unearthed a number of artifacts, along with two human skeletons found at the location of the British redoubts built in 1777. Snow's archaeological excavations and his research provided the basis for his 1977 work, Archaeological Atlas of the Saratoga Battlefield, which includes 38 maps which uses a grid system of squares of 1000 x 1000 feet. Snow had originally wanted to use the metric system by instead used the English system of measurement as the latter was employed because the base maps used this system, as did the various map makers who outlined the battlefield in 1777. Snow also wrote an account of the project and his discoveries, in context with the actual battles, in his 2016 work, 1777: Tipping point at Saratoga. (Note: The work has received highly favorable reviews from notable historians John Ferling, Carol Berkin and Robert Middlekauff.)

In 1977, given his extensive archeological research and works involved with the Indian nations of north-eastern United States, and the Indians of Maine in particular, the U.S. Department of Justice asked Dr. Snow for his assistance as a historical consultant in the preparation of their case on behalf of the Penobscot and Passamaquoddy Indian tribes involving land claims they had made against the State of Maine. At that time the case was considered one of the largest such claims ever made in the United States.

Beginning in 1982 Snow initiated The Mohawk Valley Project, which involved excavations and field investigations that continued over a 13-year period. The project was conceived in 1980 during discussions between Snow, and fellow archeologist William A. Starna. (Note: William Starna is Professor Emeritus of Anthropology, State University of New.York College at Oneonta.) Starna provided valuable assistance to Snow during the first two projects, proving crucial to the project's long-term success. To finance such an extensive project Snow received funding from the National Endowment for the Humanities, the National Science Foundation, the National Geographic Society, and other such agencies. The undertaking involved twelve different projects involving site excavations and field testing along the Mohawk Valley. The project included excavations at Cayadutta, Otstungo, and other locations along the Mohawk Valley and its river. The entire project proved to be the largest undertaking of Snow's career.

From 1989 to 1991 Snow was Professor of Anthropology and Chair of the Department of Anthropology at the University at Albany. In 1995 Snow continued his career at Pennsylvania State University, and served as head of the department of anthropology for ten years

Snow has developed techniques for distinguishing male from female hand stencils in European caves. The technical aspects of this research are outlined and charted in Snow's 2013 work. His techniques have focused on examples found in the Upper Paleolithic caves in France and Spain, while his techniques have also been employed by others at archeological sites in North America and elsewhere. (Note: Sci News, Excerpt from opening paragraph: "Anthropologist Prof Dean Snow . . . has determined that about 75 percent of the hand-prints were left by women.")

During his career Snow has received numerous awards and honors, including the National Defense Education Act Fellowship for graduate study in anthropology, Senior Scholar Fellowship, Dumbarton Oaks, Washington, D. C, and the Award for Service as President, Society for American Archaeology.

== Selected works ==
Books :

- Snow, Dean R. (1976). The archaeology of North America. New York: Viking Press. ISBN 978-0-67013-0580.
- —— (1976). American Indians: Their Archaeology and Prehistory. Thames & Hudson Ltd. ISBN 978-0-50005-0224. OL 4939348M.
- —— (1977). Archaeological Atlas of the Saratoga Battlefield.
- —— (1981). Foundations of northeast archaeology. ISBN 0-12-653960-X.
- —— (1981). Battlefield archaeology. Early Man.
- —— (1994). The Iroquois. Oxford, UK; Cambridge, MA : Blackwell. ISBN 978-1-55786-9388.
- —— (1985). The Mohawk Valley Project: 1982 Field Season Report. Institute for Northeast Anthropology, State University of New York at Albany.
- —— (1995), Editor of Iroquois Medical Botany by James Herrick. Syracuse University Press.
- —— (1995). Mohawk Valley Archaeology: The Collections. Occasional Papers. Vol. 22. Matson Museum of Anthropology, The Pennsylvania State University. ISBN 0-9647913-1-5.
- —— (1995). Mohawk Valley Archaeology: The Sites. Occasional Papers. Vol. 23. Matson Museum of Anthropology, The Pennsylvania State University. ISBN 978-0-96479-1305.
- —— (1996). "Chapter Ten: Theyanoguin". In Grumet, Robert Steven (ed.). Northeastern Indian Lives, 1632-1816. Amherst: University of Massachusetts Press. ISBN 978-1-55849-0017.
- —— (1996), Editor of In the County of the Mohawks: Early Narratives about a Native People. Syracuse University Press.
- —— (1996). "The first Americans and the differentiation of hunter-gatherer cultures". In Trigger, Bruce G.; Washburn, Wilcomb E. (eds.). The Cambridge History of the Native Peoples of the Americas. Cambridge University Press. pp. 125–200. doi:10.1017/CHOL9780521573924.004. ISBN 9781139055550.
- ——; Starna, William A. (1996). In Mohawk country : early narratives about a Native people. Syracuse University Press. ISBN 978-0-81560-4105.
- —— (1980). The Archaeology of New England. Academic Press. ISBN 978-0-12653-9509.
- —— (2010). Archaeology of Native North America. Boston : Prentice Hall. ISBN 978-0-13615-6864.
- —— (2016). 1777: Tipping Point at Saratoga. Oxford University Press. ISBN 978-0-1906-18766.
- ——; Gonlin, Nancy; Siegel, Peter E. (2019). The Archaeology of Native North America. Routledge. ISBN 978-1-35158-8249.
- —— (2023). The Extraordinary Journey of David Ingram, An Elizabethan Sailor in Native North America, the Extraordinary Journey of David Ingram: An Elizabethan Sailor in Native North America. Oxford University Press. ISBN 978-0-19764-8001.

Journals :

- Snow, Dean R.; Starna, William A. (March 1989). "Sixteenth-Century Depopulation: A View from the Mohawk Valley". American Anthropologist. New Series. 81 (1). Wiley on behalf of the American Anthropological Association: 142–179. doi:10.1525/aa.1989.91.1.02a00090. JSTOR 679743.
- ——; Bamann, Susan; Kuhn, Robert; Molnar, James (1992). "Iroquoian Archaeology". Annual Review of Anthropology. 21. Annual Reviews: 435–460. doi:10.1146/annurev.an.21.100192.002251. JSTOR 2155995. (Note: Work contains more than nine pages of valuable references.)
- —— (September 1994). "Recent Archaeological Research in the Northeastern United States and Eastern Canada". Journal of Archaeological Research. 2 (3). Springer: 199–220. doi:10.1007/BF02231432. JSTOR 41053090. S2CID 144410791.
- —— (January 1995). "Migration in Prehistory: The Northern Iroquoian Case". American Antiquity. 50 (1). Cambridge University Press: 59–79. doi:10.2307/282076. JSTOR 282076. S2CID 164163259.
- —— (June 16, 1995). "Microchronology and Demographic Evidence Relating to the Size of Pre-Columbian North American Indian Populations". Science. New Series. 268 (5217). American Association for the Advancement of Science: 1601–1604. Bibcode:1995Sci...268.1601S. doi:10.1126/science.268.5217.1601. JSTOR 2888627. PMID 17754613. S2CID 8512954.
- —— (June 1996). "Mohawk Demography and the Effects of Exogenous Epidemics on American Indian Populations". Journal of Anthropological Archaeology. 15 (2): 160–182. doi:10.1006/jaar.1996.0006.
- —— (October 1996). "More on Migration in Prehistory: Accommodating New Evidence in the Northern Iroquoian Case". American Antiquity. 61 (4). Cambridge University Press: 791–796. doi:10.2307/282019. JSTOR 282019. S2CID 163652991.
- —— (July–August 2001). "Scotland's Irish Origins". Archaeology. 54 (3). Archaeological Institute of America: 46–51. JSTOR 41779528.
- —— (2012). "FOUR Iroquoian Households: A Mohawk Longhouse at Otstungo, New York". Ancient Households of the Americas: Conceptualizing What Households do. University Press of Colorado: 117–140. JSTOR j.ctt4cgr80.10.
- —— (October 2013). "Sexual Dimorphism in European Upper Paleolithic Cave Art". American Antiquity. 78 (4): 746–761. doi:10.7183/0002-7316.78.4.746. JSTOR 43184971.
- In all Snow has written more than two dozen journal articles on North American archeology and other archeological topics.

== See also ==
- William N. Fenton – American scholar, known for his extensive studies of Haudenosaunee history and culture.
- Arthur C. Parker – American archeologist, historian, noted authority on Native American culture
- Longhouses of the indigenous peoples of North America
- Sketches of the Ancient History of the Six Nations
- Haudenosaunee settlement of the north shore of Lake Ontario
- Woodland period – Classification of archaeological cultures of North America, 1000 BC – 1492
- Elisabeth Tooker – American anthropologist and a leading historian on the Haudenosaunee nations in the United States

== Sources ==
- Roenke, Karl (1980). "Reviewed Work: Archaeological Atlas of the Saratoga Battlefield, by Dean R. Snow". Historical Archaeology. 14. Springer: 131–132. JSTOR 25615381.
- "Dean Snow, Professor Emeritus of Anthropology". Penn States College, Department of Anthropology.
- "Dean R. Snow". Oxford University Press.
- "About the author: Dean R. Snow". Amazon.
- "Feature Author: Dean Richard Snow". Routledge: Taylor & Francis Group.
- "Paleolithic Cave Painters in Europe were Mostly Women, Researcher Says". Sci News.
- Snow, Dean R. (Summer 1979). "American Society for Ethnohistory Presidential Address October 12, 1979". Ethnohistory. 26 (3). Duke University Press: 201–208. JSTOR 481558.
- "Dean R. Snow, Academic Achievements". Pennsylvania State University Press. 2013. Archived from the original on June 30, 2023.
- Starbuck, David R. (1988). "The American Headquarters for the Battle of Saratoga". Northeast Historical Archaeology. 17 (2). The Open Repository @ Binghamton: 16–39.
- Snow, Dean R. "Mohawk Valley Project". The Digital Archaeological Record.
