= William A. Starna =

Professor Emeritus of Anthropology

- Born: 1943 (age 82–83)

Academic work
- Institutions: State University of New York

William A. Starna (born March 1943) is Professor Emeritus of Anthropology at the State University of New York at Oneonta. He has written and edited numerous books and journal articles about Iroquoian and Algonquian ethnohistory and archeology and related colonial history. Starna's interests include contemporary federal and state Indian policy.

== Career ==
In 1982, Starna and archeologist Dean R. Snow began an extended archeological project in the Mohawk Valley of upstate New York. An outcome was the development of methods to determine Mohawk Indian population size over the period from 1630 to 1770.

Starna has written on approaches in archeology and produced technical reports on Native American history and culture for Indian tribes and museums. In 1986 he received a Nelson A. Rockefeller Institute of Government Senior Fellowship to study land claims in New York, which involved the loss of Iroquois lands during the eighteenth and nineteenth centuries.

== Works ==
- Starna, William A.; Snow, Dean R. (1981). Foundations of northeast archaeology. ISBN 0-12-653960-X.
- ——; Relethford, John H. (October 1985). "Deer Densities and Population Dynamics: A Cautionary Note". American Antiquity. 50 (4). Cambridge University Press: 825–832. doi:10.2307/280171. JSTOR 280171.
- ——; Gehiring, Charles T.; Fenton, William N. (October 1987). "The Tawagonshi Treaty of 1613: The Final Chapter". New York History. 68 (4). Fenimore Art Museum: 373–393. JSTOR 23178797.
- ——; Vecsey, Christopher (1988). Iroquois land claims. Syracuse University Press. ISBN 978-0-81560-2224.
- ——; Watkins, Ralph (Winter 1991). "Northern Iroquoian Slavery". Ethnohistory. 38 (1). Duke University Press: 34–57. doi:10.2307/482790. JSTOR 482790.
- —— (Autumn 1991). "The Southeast Syndrome: The Prior Restraint of a Non-Event". American Indian Quarterly. 15 (4). University of Nebraska Press: 493–502. JSTOR 1185366.
- ——; Snow, Dean R. (1996). In Mohawk country : early narratives about a Native people. Syracuse University Press. ISBN 978-0-81560-4105.
- ——; Hamell, George R. (October 1996). "History and the Burden of Proof: The Case of Iroquois Influence on the U.S. Constitution". New York History. 77 (4). Fenimore Art Museum: 427–452. JSTOR 23182553.
- —— (2013). From Homeland to New Land: A History of the Mahican Indians, 1600-1830. University of Nebraska Press. ISBN 978-0-80324-4955.
- —— (Winter 2003). "Assessing American Indian-Dutch Studies: Missed and Missing Opportunities". New York History. 84 (1). Fenimore Art Museum: 4–31. JSTOR 23183474.
- ——; Fenton, William N. (2007). Iroquois Journey: An Anthropologist Remembers. ISBN 978-0-80322-0218.
- —— (September 2008). "Retrospecting the Origins of the League of the Iroquois". Proceedings of the American Philosophical Society. 152 (3). American Philosophical Society: 279–321. JSTOR 40541589.
- ——; Dally-Starna, Corinna (2009). Gideon's People, 2-volume Set. University of Nebraska Press. ISBN 978-0-80322-4278.
- —— (Winter 2017). "After the Handbook: A Perspective on 40 years of Scholarship Since the Publication of the Handbook of North American Indians, Volume 15, Northeast". New York History. 98 (1). Fenimore Art Museum: 112–146. JSTOR 90018774.

_{Further reading}

- Sturtevant, William (1978). Handbook of North American Indians (20 volume work). Vol. XV, Northeast Indian nations. Smithsonian Institution.

== See also ==
- William N. Fenton, American scholar, known for his extensive studies of Iroquois history and culture.
- Arthur C. Parker, archaeologist, historian, noted authority on Native American culture
- Elisabeth Tooker—Anthropologist and a leading historian on the Iroquois in the United States

== Sources ==
- Snow, Dean R. (1995). Mohawk Valley Archaeology: The Collections. Occasional Papers. Vol. 22. Matson Museum of Anthropology, The Pennsylvania State University. ISBN 0-9647913-1-5.
- "William Starna elected to institute office". The Oneonta Bulletin. September 2, 2020.
- "William Starna On Native People In Hudson April 19th". New York Almanack. March 22, 2018.
- Lauter, Jenna (Dec 4, 2015). "William A. Starna, Professor Emeritus of Anthropology, State University of New York College at Oneonta" (PDF).
- "2018 Lecture Series". Jacob Leisler Institute for the Study of Early New York History. 2023.
- "American Indians in the Mid-Hudson Valley". Jacob Leisler Institute for the Study of Early New York History. 2023.
