= Mohawk language =

Iroquoian language spoken by Mohawks in the United States and Canada

Mohawk
- Kanienʼkéha; Kanyenʼkéha
- Pronunciation: [ɡanjʌ̃ʔˈɡɛha]
- Native to: United States, Canada
- Region: Ontario, Quebec, New York
- Ethnicity: Mohawk people
- Native speakers: 653 (2024)
- Language family: Iroquoian: Northern; Lake Iroquoian; Five Nations; Mohawk–Oneida; Mohawk

Language codes
- ISO 639-2: moh
- ISO 639-3: moh
- Glottolog: moha1258
- ELP: Mohawk
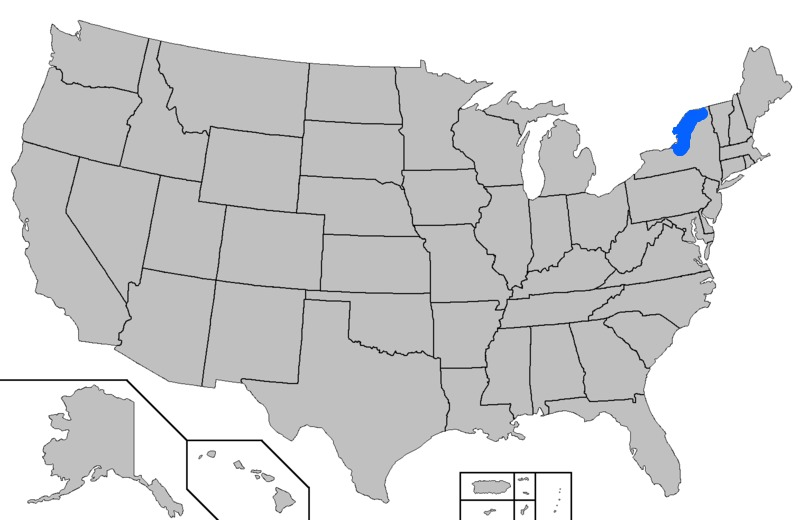
- Current distribution of Mohawk speakers in the United States

- Mohawk is classified as Definitely Endangered by the UNESCO Atlas of the World's Languages in Danger

kanien "flint"
- People: Kanienʼkehá:ka
- Language: Kanienʼkéha
- Country: Kanièn:ke; Haudenosauneega

Mohawk (/ˈmoʊhɔːk/) or Kanienʼkéha (IPA: [ɡanjʌ̃ʔˈɡɛha], '[language] of the Flint Place') is an Iroquoian language currently spoken by around 3,500 people of the Mohawk nation, located primarily in current or former Haudenosaunee territories, predominantly in Canada (southern Ontario and Quebec), and to a lesser extent in the United States (western and northern New York), although the historical center of the language was further south.

The word "Mohawk" is an exonym. In the Mohawk language, the people say that they are from Kanièn꞉ke ('Mohawk Country' or 'Flint Stone Place') and that they are Kanienʼkehá꞉ka ('People of the Flint Stone Place' or 'People of the Flint Nation'). The Mohawks were extremely wealthy traders, as other nations in their confederacy needed their flint for tool-making. Their Algonquian-speaking neighbors (and competitors), the People of Muh-heck Heek Ing or Mohicans, called the People of Kanièn꞉ke "Maw Unk Lin" or 'Bear People'. The Dutch heard and wrote this name as "Mohawks" and so the People of Kanièn꞉ke are often referred to as Mohawks. The Dutch also referred to the Mohawk as Egils or Maquas. The French adapted those terms as Aigniers or Maquis, or called them by the generic Iroquois.

== History ==
The Mohawks were the largest and most powerful of the original Five Nations, controlling a vast area of land on the eastern frontier of the Haudenosaunee (Iroquois) Confederacy. The Mohawk Valley, North Country, and Adirondack region of present-day Upstate New York constituted the greater part of the Mohawk-speaking area until the end of the 18th century.

== Current status ==
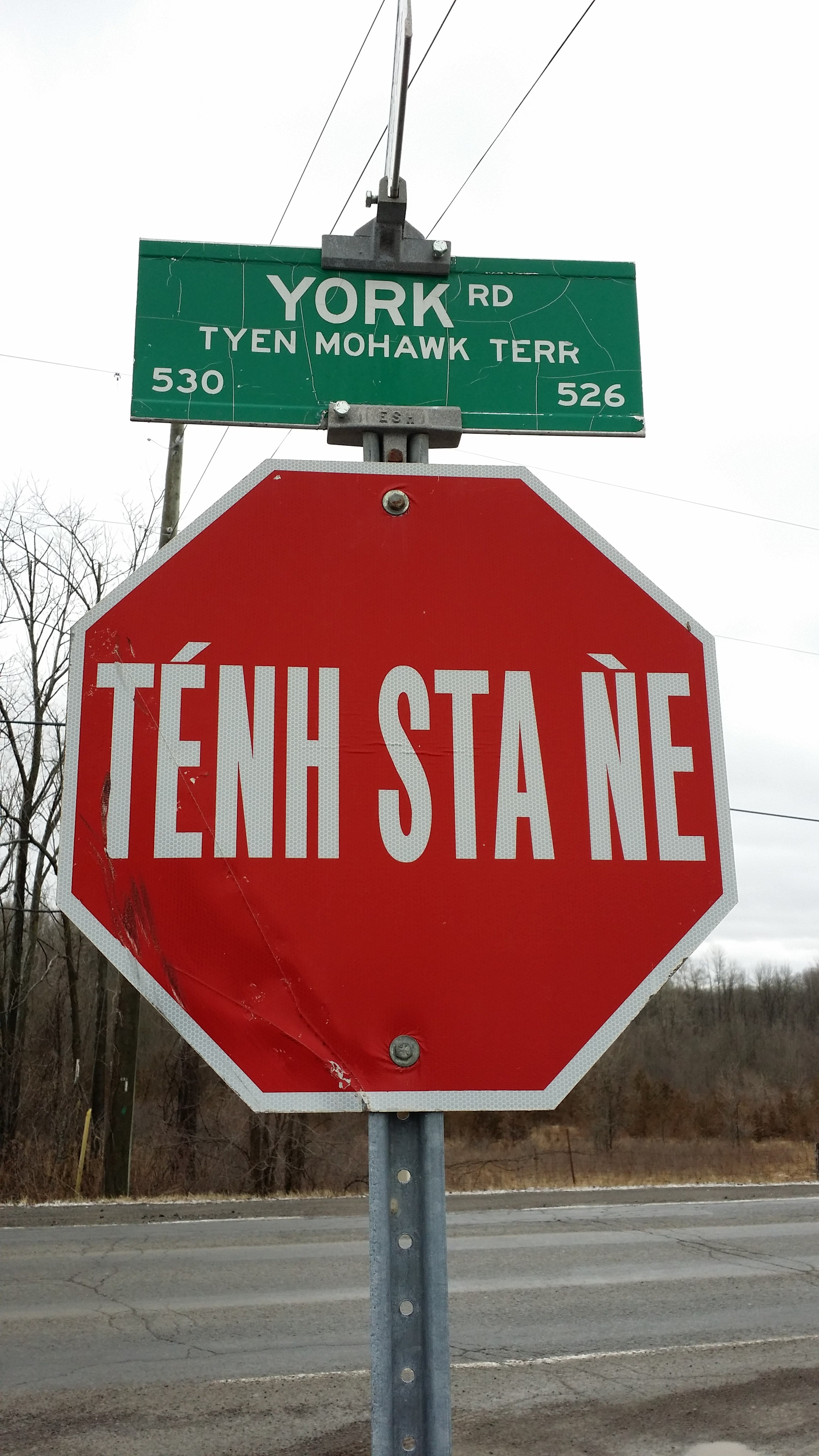
Mohawk language stop sign

The Mohawk language is currently classified as threatened, and the number of native speakers has continually declined over the past several years.

Mohawk has the largest number of speakers among the Northern Iroquoian languages, and today it is the only one with more than a thousand remaining speakers. At Ahkwesásne, residents have founded a language immersion school (pre-K to grade 8) in Kanienʼkéha to revive the language. With their children learning it, parents and other family members are taking language classes, too.

The radio station CKON-FM (97.3 on-air in Hogansburg, New York and Saint Regis, Quebec and widely available online through streaming), licensed by the Ahkwesáhsne Mohawk Nation, broadcasts portions of its programming in Kanienʼkéha. The call sign is a reference to the Mohawk word she:kon, which means "hello".

A Mohawk language immersion school was established. Mohawk parents, concerned with the lack of culture-based education in public and parochial schools, founded the Ahkwesásne Freedom School in 1979. Six years later, the school implemented a Mohawk language immersion curriculum based on a traditional cycle of fifteen seasonal ceremonies, and on the Mohawk Thanksgiving Address, or Ohén꞉ton Karihwatékwen, "The words before all else." Every morning, teachers and students gather in the hallway to recite the Thanksgiving Address in Mohawk.

An adult immersion program was also created in 1985 to address the issue of intergenerational fluency decline of the Mohawk language.

Kana'tsioharè:ke (meaning "place of the clean pot"), is a small Mohawk community on the north bank of the Mohawk River, west of Fonda, New York.^{[1]} Kana'tsioharè:ke was created to be a "Carlisle Indian Boarding School in Reverse", teaching Mohawk language and culture.^{[2]} Located at the ancient homeland of the Kanien'kehá:ka (Mohawk), it was re-established in September 1993 under the leadership of Thomas R. Porter (Sakokwenionkwas, "The One Who Wins").^{[3]} The community must raise their own revenue and frequently hold cultural presentations, workshops, and academic events, including an annual Strawberry Festival.^{[4]} A craft shop on site features genuine handmade Native crafts from all over North America.

The primary mission of the community is to try to preserve traditional values, culture, language and lifestyles in the guidance of the Kaienerekowa (Great Law of Peace).^{[5]} Kanatsiohareke, Inc. is a non-profit organization under IRS code 501(c)(3).

In 2006, over 600 people were reported to speak the language in Canada, many of them elderly.

Kahnawà:ke is located at a metropolitan location, near central Montreal, Quebec, Canada. As Kahnawà:ke is located near Montreal, many individuals speak both English and French, and this has contributed to a decline in the use of Mohawk language over the past century. The Mohawk Survival School, the first immersion program was established in 1979. The school's mission was to revitalize Mohawk language. To examine how successful the program had been, questionnaire was given to the Kahnawà:ke residents following the first year. The results indicated that teaching towards younger generation have been successful and showed an increase in the ability to speak the language in private settings, as well as an increase in the mixing of Mohawk in English conversations were found.

=== Current number of speakers ===
In 2011, there were approximately 3,500 speakers of Mohawk, primarily in Quebec, Ontario and western New York. Immersion (monolingual) classes for young children at Ahkwesásne and other reserves are helping to train new first-language speakers. The importance of immersion classes among parents grew after the passage of Bill 101, and in 1979 the Mohawk Survival School was established to facilitate language training at the high school level. Kahnawà:ke and Kanaʼtsioharè:ke offer immersion classes for adults. In the 2016 Canadian census, 875 people said Mohawk was their only mother tongue.

=== Usage in popular culture ===
Mohawk dialogue features prominently in Ubisoft Montreal's 2012 action-adventure open world video game Assassin's Creed III, through the game's main character, the half-Mohawk, half-Welsh Ratonhnhaké꞉ton, also called Connor, and members of his native Kanièn꞉ke village around the times of the American Revolution. Ratonhnhaké꞉ton was voiced and modelled by Crow actor Noah Bulaagawish Watts. Hiawatha, the leader of the Iroquoian civilization in Sid Meier's Civilization V, voiced by Kanentokon Hemlock, speaks Mohawk.

The stories of Mohawk language learners are also chronicled in 'Raising The Words', a short documentary film released in 2016 that explores personal experiences with Mohawk language revitalization in Tyendinaga, a Mohawk community roughly 200 kilometres east of Toronto, Ontario, Canada. The film was set to be shown at the 4th annual Ethnografilm festival in Paris, France.

The Mohawk language is used in the 2017 film Mohawk, the 1991 film Black Robe, the 1990 film The Company of Strangers, and the 2020 television series Barkskins.

The language was used throughout in the Marvel Studios animated series What If...?, in the season 2 episode "What If... Kahhori Reshaped the World?", where they introduce an original Mohawk superhero named Kahhori.

== Dialects ==
Mohawk has three major dialects: Western (Ohswé:ken and Kenhté:ke), Central (Ahkwesáhsne), and Eastern (Kahnawà꞉ke and Kanehsatà꞉ke); the differences between them are largely phonological. These are related to the major Mohawk territories since the eighteenth century. The pronunciation of /r/ and several consonant clusters may differ in the dialects.

	Phonology	Western	Central	Eastern
seven	/tsjáːta/	[ˈd͡ʒaːda]	[ˈd͡ʒaːda]	[ˈd͡zaːda]
nine	/tjóhton/	[ˈdjɔhdũ]	[ˈɡjɔhdũ]	[ˈd͡ʒɔhdũ]
I fall	/kjaʔtʌʔs/	[ˈɡjàːdʌ̃ʔs]	[ˈɡjàːdʌ̃ʔs]	[ˈd͡ʒàːdʌ̃ʔs]
dog	/érhar/	[ˈɛrhar]	[ˈɛlhal]	[ˈɛːɽhaɽ]

== Phonology ==
The phoneme inventory of Mohawk is as follows (using the International Phonetic Alphabet).

=== Consonants ===
A typologically uncommon feature of Mohawk (and Iroquoian) phonology is that there are no labials (m, p, b, f, v), except in a few adoptions from French and English, where [m] and [p] appear (e.g., mátsis "matches" and aplám "Abraham"); these sounds are late additions to Mohawk phonology and were introduced after widespread European contact.

Mohawk Consonants
	Dental	Palatal	Velar	Glottal
Nasal	n			
Plosive	t (d)		k (ɡ)	ʔ
Affricate		d͡ʒ		
Fricative	s (z)			h
Approximant	l / r	j	w	

==== Consonant clusters ====
The Central (Ahkwesáhsne) dialect has the following consonant clusters. All clusters can occur word-medially; those on a tinted background can also occur word-initially.

1st↓ · 2nd→	t	k	s	h	l	n	d͡ʒ	j	w
t	tt	tk	ts	th					
k	kt	kk	ks	kh					kw
ʔ	ʔt	ʔk	ʔs		ʔl	ʔn	ʔd͡ʒ	ʔj	ʔw
s	st	sk	ss	sh	sl	sn		sj	sw
h	ht	hk	hs		hl	hn	hd͡ʒ	hj	hw
l				lh				lj	
n				nh	nl			nj	
d͡ʒ								d͡ʒj	
w				wh					

Note that /th/ and /sh/ are pronounced individually in consonant clusters, not single sounds like in English ⟨th⟩ and ⟨sh⟩ in thing and she.

==== Consonant voicing ====
The consonants /k/, /t/ and the clusters /ts kw/ are pronounced voiced before any voiced sound (i.e. a vowel or /j/). They are voiceless at the end of a word or before a voiceless sound. /s/ is voiced word initially and between vowels.

kà꞉sere [ˈɡǎːzɛrɛ] "car"
thí꞉ken [ˈthǐːɡʌ̃] "that"
shé꞉kon [ˈshɛ̌ːɡũ] "still"

=== Vowels ===
	Front		Central		Back	
	short	long	short	long	short	long
Close	i	iː			ũ	ũː
Mid	e	eː	ʌ̃	ʌ̃ː	o	oː
Open			a	aː		

- /a e i o/ are oral vowels with no nasal counterparts.
- /ũ ʌ̃/ are nasal vowels with no oral counterparts.

=== Suprasegmentals ===
==== Stress, length, and tone ====
Mohawk words have both stress and tone, and it can be classified as a restricted tone system (aka pitch-accent system). Stressed vowels carry one of four tonal configurations, two of which are contour tones: high, low, rising and falling tones. Contour tones only occur in syllables with long vowels.

- High tone usually appears in closed syllables containing a short vowel, or before /h/. It is written with an acute accent: káhi /ˈkáhi/ 'fruit', oháha /oˈháha/ 'road'.
- Rising tone generally occurs in open syllables. It is written with a combination acute accent and colon: kaná꞉ta /kaˈnáːta/ 'town', rón꞉kwe /ˈrṹːkwe/ 'man'. Notice that when it is one of the nasal vowels which is long, the colon appears after the ⟨n⟩.
- Long-falling tone is the result of the word stress falling on a vowel which comes before a /ʔ/ or /h/ + a consonant (there may be, of course, exceptions to this and other rules). The underlying /ʔ/ or /h/ reappears when stress is placed elsewhere. It is written with a grave accent and colon: onekwèn꞉ta /oneˈkwʌ̃̂ːta/ 'stomach'.

== Orthography ==
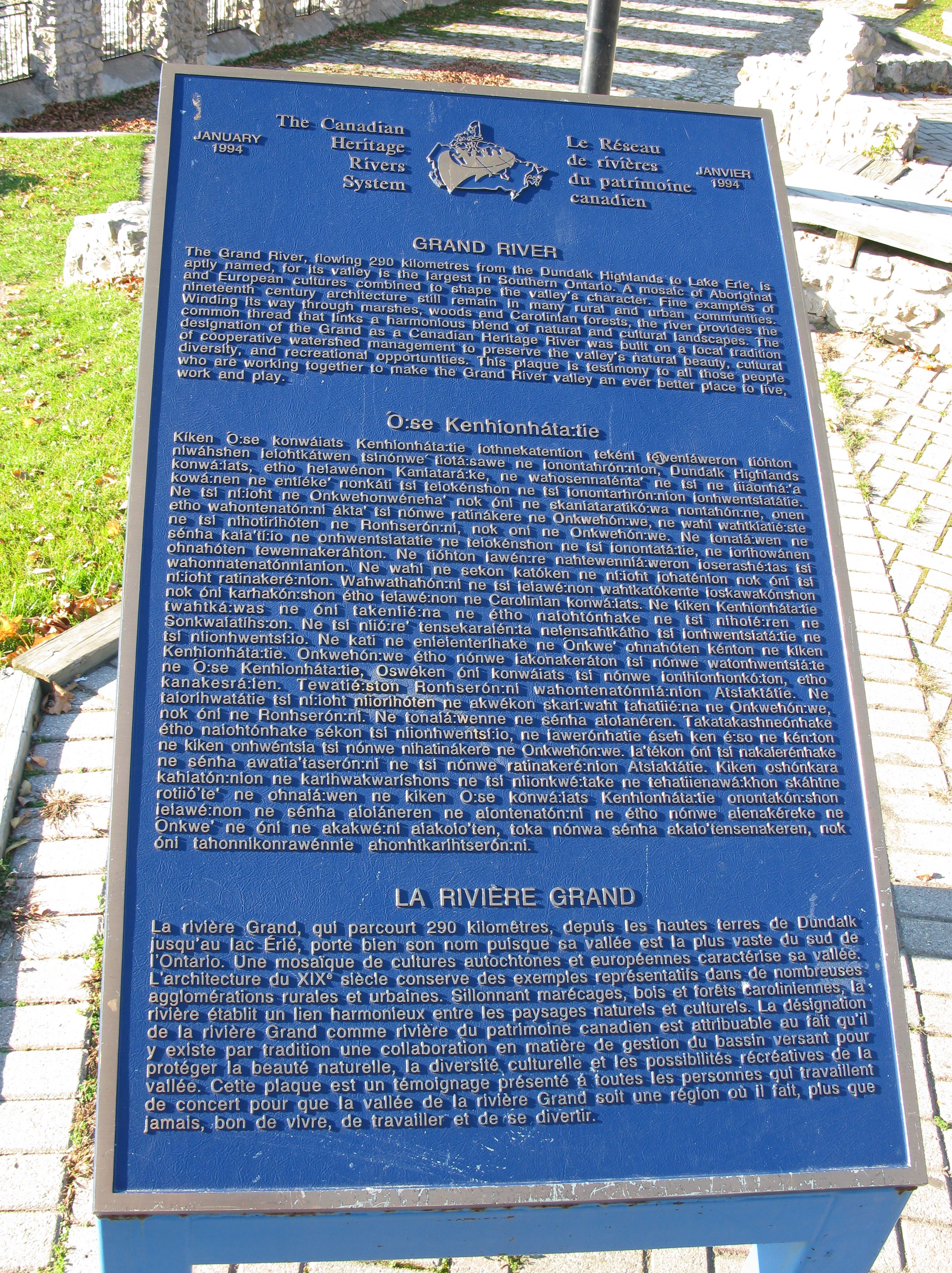
Plaque in English, Mohawk, and French describing the Grand River. Plaque located in Galt, Cambridge, Ontario

Mohawk orthography was standardized in 1993. The orthography uses the following letters: ⟨Aa Ee Hh Ii Kk Ll Nn Oo Rr Ss Tt Ww Yy⟩ and ⟨’⟩. It uses diacritics for tone, stress, and vowel duration, along with three digraphs: ⟨ts en on⟩ for /d͡ʒ ʌ̃ ũ/, respectively.

The standard allows for some variation of how the language is represented, and the clusters /ts(i)/, /tj/, and /ky/ are written as pronounced in each community. The orthography matches the phonological analysis as above except:

- The glottal stop /ʔ/ is written with an apostrophe ⟨ʼ⟩, but is often omitted at the end of words, especially in Eastern dialect where it is typically not pronounced.
- /dʒ/
  - Written ⟨ts⟩ in the Eastern dialect (reflecting pronunciation), as in tsá꞉ta [ˈdzǎːda] "seven".
  - Written ⟨tsi⟩ in the Central dialect, as in tsiá꞉ta [ˈdʒǎːda] "seven".
  - Written ⟨tsy⟩ in the Western dialect, as in tsyá꞉ta [ˈdʒǎːda] "seven".
- /j/
  - Typically written with ⟨i⟩ in the Central and Eastern dialects, as in ià꞉iaʼk [ˈjâːjaʔk] "six".
  - Typically written with a ⟨y⟩ in the Western dialect, as in yà꞉yaʼk [ˈjâːjaʔk] "six".
- The nasalized vowel /ʌ̃/ is written as ⟨en⟩, as in énska [ˈʌ̃́nska] "one".
- The nasalized vowel /ũ/ is written ⟨on⟩, as in shaʼté꞉kon [shaʔˈdɛ̌ːɡũ] "eight".
- In cases where the vowel /e/ or /o/ is followed by an /n/ in the same syllable, the /n/ is written with an under-macron diacritic: keṉhó꞉tons "I am closing a door". If the ⟨ṉ⟩ did not have the diacritic, the sequence ⟨en⟩ would be pronounced [ʌ̃]. Another convention is to write the nasal vowel with an ogonek, e.g. ⟨ę⟩.

The low-macron accent is not a part of standard orthography and is not used in the Central or Eastern dialects. In standard orthography, ⟨h⟩ is written before ⟨n⟩ to create the [en] or [on]: kehnhó꞉tons 'I am closing it'.

== Grammar ==
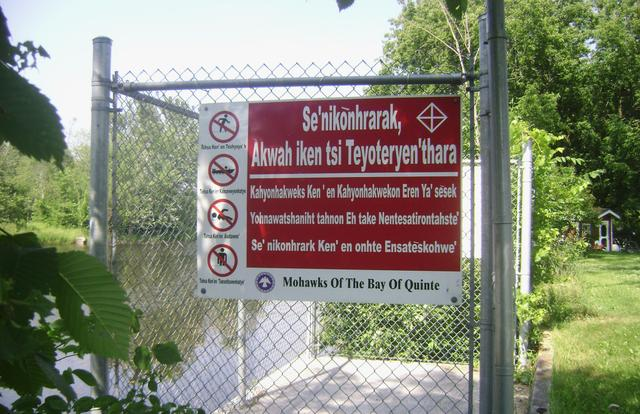
A warning sign in Mohawk

Mohawk words tend to be longer on average than words in English, primarily because they consist of a large number of morphemes.

Mohawk expresses a number of distinctions on its pronominal elements: person (1st, 2nd, 3rd), number (singular, dual, plural), gender (masculine, feminine/indefinite, feminine/neuter) and inclusivity/exclusivity on the first person dual and plural. Pronominal information is encoded in prefixes on the verbs; separate pronoun words are used for emphasis. There are three main paradigms of pronominal prefixes: subjective (with dynamic verbs), objective (with stative verbs), and transitive.

There are three core components to the Mohawk proposition: the noun, the predicate, and the particle.

Mohawk words can be composed of many morphemes. What is expressed in English in many words can often be expressed by just one Mohawk word, a phenomenon known as polysynthesis.

=== Nouns ===
Nouns are given the following form in Mohawk:

Nominal Prefix	Noun Stem	Nominal Suffix

Noun prefixes give information relating to gender, animacy, number and person, and identify the word as a noun.

For example:

1) oʼnenste "corn"

2) oienʼkwa "tobacco"

Here, the prefix o- is generally found on nouns found in natural environments. Another prefix exists which marks objects that are made by humans.

3) kanhoha "door"

4) kaʼkhare "slip, skirt"

Here, the prefix ka- is generally found on human-made things. Phonological variation amongst the Mohawk dialects also gives rise to the prefix ga-.

Noun roots are similar to nouns in English in that the noun root in Mohawk and the noun in English have similar meanings.

(Caughnawaha)

5) –eri- "heart"

6) –hi- "river"

7) –itshat- "cloud"

These noun roots are bare. There is no information other than the noun root itself. Morphemes cannot occur individually. That is, to be well-formed and grammatical, -eri- needs pronominal prefixes, or the root can be incorporated into a predicate phrase.

Nominal suffixes are not necessary for a well-formed noun phrase. The suffixes give information relating to location and attributes. For example:

Locative Suffix:

8) i. onuʼtaʼ "hill"

ii. onutaʼke "on the hill"

9) i. onekwvhsaʼ "blood"

ii. onekwvhsaʼke "in the blood"

Here the suffix < -ke > denotes location.

Attributive Suffix:

10) kvjyʼ "fish"

11) kvjaʼkoʼwa "sturgeon" or "big fish"

Here, the suffix -koʼwa denotes an augmentative suffix, which increases the attribute of the noun in question.

=== Verbs ===
Mohawk verbs are one of the more complex parts of the language, composed of many morphemes that describe grammatical relations. The verb takes the following structure:

Pre-Pronominal Prefix	Pronominal Prefix	Reflexive And Reciprocal Particle	Incorporated Noun Root	Verb Root	Suffixes

Mohawk grammar allows for whole propositions to be expressed by one word, which we classify as a verb. The other core elements (subjects, objects, etc.) can be incorporated into the verb. Well-formed verb phrases contain at the bare minimum a verb root and a pronominal prefix. The rest of the elements are not necessary.

Tense, aspect and modality are expressed via suffixes on the verb phrase as well.

Some examples:

k- atorat- s
1SG- hunt HAB
"I hunt"

This is composed of three parts; the pronominal prefix, the verb root and a suffix which marks aspect. Mohawk seems to prefer aspect markers to tense to express grammaticalisation in time.

n- yaʼ- t- v- s- ha- yahyaʼk- eʼ
PTV TRLOC DU- FUT- ITER- noun- verb- {root suffix}
"…where he will cross over again from here to there…"

This example shows multiple prefixes that can be affixed to the verb root, but certain affixes are forbidden from coexisting together. For example, the aorist and the future tense affix will not be found on the same well-formed sentence.

v- se- natahr- aʼ
FUT NOM-PRO VB-ROOT {momentary ASP suffix}
"You will make a visit"

a- se- natahr- aʼ
COND NOM-PRO VB-ROOT {momentary suffix}
"You should make a visit"

sa- natahr- u- hneʼ
ACC-PRO VB-ROOT STAT {momentary suffix}
"You were visiting"

Here, different prefixes and suffixes are used that mark tense, aspect and modality.

Most grammatical relations in Mohawk are expressed through various different affixes onto a verb. Subjects, objects, and relationships between subjects and objects are given their own affixes. In Mohawk, each transitive relationship between subjects and objects are given their own prefix. For example:

ku- noruhkwa
I-you love
"I love you"

ri- noruhkwa
I-him love
"I love him"

ke- noruhkwa
I-it/her love
"I love it/her"

Each of these affixes are denoting a transitive relationship between two things. There are more affixes for denoting transitive relationships like "we-they", they-us (inclusive/exclusive), etc.

=== Noun incorporation ===
One of the features of Mohawk called noun incorporation allows a verb to absorb a noun into it. When incorporation happens, an epenthetic a can appear between the noun root and the verb root. For example:

Owiraʼa wahrakeʼ ne oʼwahru
Baby ate the meat

With noun incorporation:

Owiraʼa wahaʼwahrakeʼ
Baby meat-ate

waʼe -ks -ohareʼ
{} dish wash
"She dish-washed"

waʼke -nakt -a -hninuʼ
{} bed increment buy
"I bed-bought"

waha -naʼtar -a -kwetareʼ
{} bread increment -cut
"He bread-cut"

Most of these examples take the epenthetic vowel a; it can be omitted if the incorporated noun does not give rise a complex consonant cluster in the middle of the word.

== Education ==
Six Nations Polytechnic in Ohsweken, Ontario, offers Ogwehoweh language diploma and degree programs in Mohawk or Cayuga.

Since September 2017, the University of Waterloo in Waterloo, Ontario, offers a credit course in Mohawk; the classes are given at Renison University College in collaboration with the Waterloo Aboriginal Education Centre, St. Paul's University College.

Since the 2017-2018 academic year, McMaster University has been offering two for-credit courses on the Cayuga language. Previously, it had been listing a course administered by and offered at Six Nations Polytechnic, with an option to transfer it to the McMaster diploma with a letter of permission.

Resources are available for self-study of Mohawk by a person with no or limited access to native speakers of Mohawk. Here is a collection of some resources currently [as of when?] available:

- Talk Mohawk, an iPhone app and Android app, includes words, phrases, and the Thanksgiving Address from Monica Peters
- Rosetta Stone levels 1 and 2 (CD-ROM) edited by Frank and Carolee Jacobs and produced by the Kanienʼkehá:ka Onkwawén:na Raotitióhkwa Language and Cultural Center at Kahnawà:ke (secondary/high school level)
- A collection of 33 vocabulary lessons provided by the Mohawk Language Custodian Association. Lesson Collection at KanehsatakeVoices.com
- David Kanatawakhon Maracle, Kanyenʼkeha Tewatati (Let's Speak Mohawk), ISBN 0-88432-723-X (book and 3 companion tapes are available from Audio Forum) (high school/college level)
- Nancy Bonvillain, A Grammar of Akwesasne Mohawk (professional level)
- Nancy Bonvillain and Beatrice Francis, Mohawk–English, English–Mohawk Dictionary, 1971, University of the State of New York in Albany (word lists, by category)
- Chris W. Harvey, Sathahitáhkhe' Kanienʼkéha (Introductory Level Mohawk Language Textbook, Eastern Dialect), ISBN 0-9683814-2-1 (high school/college level)
- Josephine S. Horne, Kanienʼkéha Iakorihonnién:nis (book and 5 companion CDs are available from Kahnawà꞉ke Cultural Center) (secondary/high school level)
- Nora Deering and Helga Harries Delisle, Mohawk: A Teaching Grammar (book and 6 companion tapes are available from Kahnawà꞉ke Cultural Center) (high school/college level)
- On October 8, 2013, Daryl Kramp, Member of Parliament for Prince Edward-Hastings announced, on behalf of Shelly Glover, Minister of Canadian Heritage and Official Languages, support for the Tsi Kionhnheht Ne Onkwawenna Language Circle (TKNOLC) to develop Mohawk language-learning tools.
- Tom Porter and Dorothy Lazore, Nobody Can Do It Better Than Wariso꞉se: Language Guide and Dictionary
- FirstVoices, a free online learning tool, includes videos, text entries, pictures, games, an iPhone app and Android app to facilitate language learning, teaching and revitalization.
- Speak Mohawk, an app that can be downloaded from iTunes or Google Play, facilitates language by teaching words and phrases

=== Keyboards ===
There are software packages available for both the Microsoft Windows and Mac operating systems to enable typing of the Mohawk language electronically. Both packages are available through FirstVoices, a web-based project to support Indigenous peoples' teaching and archiving of language and culture.

== See also ==
- Iroquoian languages
- Oneida language
- Seneca language
- Mohawk Dutch
