= Athens High School =

Athens High School may refer to:

== In Canada ==
- Athens District High School, Athens, Ontario

== In the United States ==
- Athens High School (Alabama), Athens, Alabama
- Athens High School (Georgia), Athens, Georgia (merged with Burney-Harris High School to form Clarke Central High School in 1970)
- Athens High School (Illinois), Athens, Illinois
- Athens High School (Louisiana), Athens, Louisiana
- Athens High School (Athens, Michigan), Athens, Michigan
- Athens High School (Troy, Michigan), Troy, Michigan
- Coxsackie-Athens High School, Coxsackie, New York
- Athens Drive High School, Raleigh, North Carolina
- Athens High School (Ohio), The Plains, Ohio
- Athens High School (Texas), Athens, Texas
- Athens High School (Wisconsin), Athens, Wisconsin
