= Keddy Nature Sanctuary =

Coordinates: 45°05′00″N 76°13′30″W

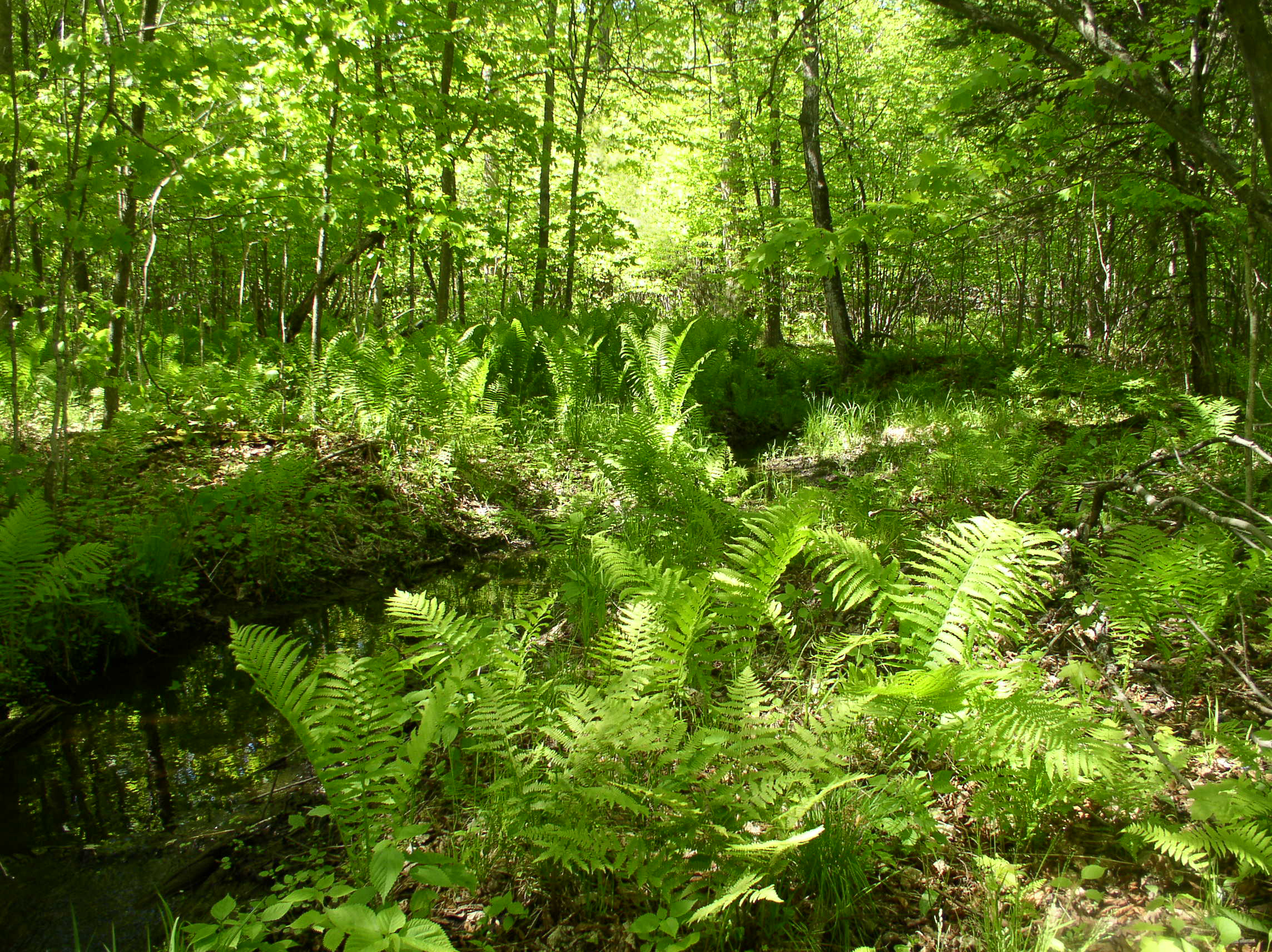
This seepage valley has a deciduous forest canopy, with an understory of ostrich fern, and supports several with calcium-demanding plants including Clinton's fern and narrow-leaved spleenwort. This valley is a headwater for a stream that eventually feeds into Mississippi Lake.

The Keddy Nature Sanctuary consists of approximately one square mile of forest and wetland on the very edge of the Canadian Shield, in the Township of Drummond/North Elmsley, Lanark County, in Ontario, Canada. It is mostly second growth temperate deciduous forest, interspersed with wetlands and beaver ponds, as well as sedge-dominated rock-ridges. A central ridge has more than twenty hectares of hemlock forest. There are also old fields that remain from pastures created in the previous century. Parts of this property, as well as adjoining lands, are designated as the Scotch Corners Provincially Significant Wetland. The property is one of several protected by the Mississippi Madawaska Land Trust.

== Geology ==
The bed rock is gneiss, and rounded gneiss ridges alternate with valleys filled with glacial till. Although the soils are therefore acidic and shallow, the presence of certain plants that require calcium, such as yellow lady slipper and bulblet bladder fern, i that some of the glacial till may contain marble from landscapes further north in the county. The east side of the property lies beneath the Champlain Sea, and so has clay deposits rather than till; some of these clay plains are covered in thick organic deposits. This produces a flat, poorly drained landscape. The shoreline of the Champlain Sea can still be recognized as it meanders from northeast to southwest across the property.

== Forests ==
The original forests were predominantly sugar maple, beech, white pine and hemlock, which is typical for land on the Canadian shield in eastern Ontario. These forests were heavily logged in the 1800s and then often cleared for pastures and fields. White pine was removed for ship building, hemlock was removed for tanning leather, and most other species of trees were burned to produce potash which was exported to Europe. Thus, the current forests have altered species composition, with smaller trees and reduced soil fertility.

== Human history ==
The Keddy Nature Sanctuary lies on the extreme east side of a tract that was surveyed and subdivided as part of the Perth Military Settlement in 1816. Most of KNS was settled somewhat later in history, as lands nearer Perth and on better soils were cleared and farmed first. The settlement history of the property is evident in the remains of four former farmhouses, numerous stone wells, several wells, and even a small mica mine, as well as non-indigenous plants such as lilacs. The property was donated to the Mississippi Madawaska Land Trust by the Keddy family in 2014.

== Wetlands ==
The property features more than ten ponds, which are interconnected by seepage areas and vernal pools formed by the melting snow in the spring. There are healthy populations of at least eight species of frogs: wood frogs, leopard frogs, spring peepers, American toads, gray treefrogs, mink frogs, green frogs and bull frogs. The earliest to call each year are usually wood frogs and spring peepers, often when ponds still have areas of ice. Wood frogs are rapid breeders in small temporary ponds, also known as vernal ponds; mating and egg laying are completed in just a few days. Gray treefrogs, on the other hand, have a much longer calling period. They call from the trees before moving to water, they call from the water while mating, and then they call while leaving the pond for the forest. Bullfrogs are the last to call, usually during the hot evenings of July and August. Other amphibians include spotted, blue spotted and red-backed salamanders. There are also populations of snapping turtles and painted turtles, with recorded sightings of Blanding's turtles; several south-facing slopes are actively used by nesting turtles. As noted above, there are frequent sightings of wetland mammals, including otters, muskrat, beavers and ermine. There is a rich wetland flora typical of ponds on the Canadian shield, such as yellow water lilies and water shield. There are also less common species, including green arrow arum and purple-fringed orchid. There is one known species of a carnivorous plant, the horned bladderwort. There are also large clones of semi-aquatic sedges that support populations of two rare butterflies, the broad-winged skipper and the Appalachian brown.

== Terrestrial animals ==
The dominant herbivores at KNS are deer, beavers and porcupines. The forests have clearly been shaped, and continue to be shaped, by all three. Deer browse and graze heavily, and have depleted native populations of understory species such as yew, as well as preventing regeneration of preferred foods such as hemlock and yellow birch. Beavers have removed hardwood trees in the vicinity of most ponds, allowing dense conifer stands to form. One of the most common trees is now ironwood, a species that is not commonly eaten by deer or beavers. Many rock ridges are dominated by ironwood with a sedge understorey. Porcupines feed mostly on sugar maple and red oak trees, but seasonally feed in hemlock trees. All three of these species are likely at higher than normal populations owing to the comparative absence of natural predators. Wolves and bobcats have been extirpated. Coyotes do hunt in the forest, however, and remove some deer, while fishers have been observed, and presumably take some porcupines.

The birds reflect the landscape. Many birds use the deciduous forest to nest in the spring. These include rose-breasted grosbeaks, black-throated green warblers, ovenbirds, and great crested flycatchers. The wetlands provide migratory resting areas for large numbers of ducks, particularly wood ducks, hooded mergansers and ring-necked ducks. Wood ducks and hooded mergansers often nest. There are recorded nests of both heron and osprey, and for about a decade in the 1970s there was a heronry of more than thirty nests. There are also records of nesting turkey vultures. Owing in part to the quality of the forest, there are at least four species of woodpeckers: downy, hairy, yellow-bellied sapsucker, and pileated. Barred owls are regularly heard and seen.

== Highlights ==
Some of the biological highlights of the property include:

- a large stand of native hemlock, including trees in excess of a century in age
- populations of red oak and bur oak with trees in excess of a century in age
- a seepage valley with calcium-demanding plants including Clintons fern and narrow-leaved spleenwort.
- more than a kilometer of Champlain Sea shoreline, with associated springs and seepage areas
- wetlands that are part of a provincially significant wetland
- headwaters for several creeks draining into Mississippi Lake
- a large population of green arrow arum in the largest beaver pond
- a large population of an uncommon orchid, downy rattlesnake plantain, on clay from the Champlain sea
- nesting osprey and great blue herons
- nesting turkey vultures
- populations of wetland mammals including otters, muskrat, beavers and ermine.
- old fields with the only known populations of whorled milkwort in Lanark County
- large populations of milkweed with documented breeding by monarch butterflies
- two rare butterflies, the broad winged skipper and the Appalachian brown, that lay their eggs on semi-aquatic sedges

== Management ==
The land is being acquired and protected by the Mississippi Madawaska land trust, for protection in perpetuity. Unlike some other land trust properties, the primary purpose of KNS is to provide a sanctuary for wild nature. Hence, recreational activities are not actively encouraged, and no facilities are yet provided for guests. Visitors are regularly accommodated, particularly those interested in furthering knowledge of the biota, but prior permission is required.
