= RDHS =

RDHS may refer to:

- Regina Dominican High School, Wilmette, Illinois, United States
- River Dell Regional High School, Oradell, New Jersey, United States
- Rockland District High School, Rockland, Ontario, Canada
