= Upper Canada District School Board =

School board in Ontario, Canada

Upper Canada District School Board UCDSB
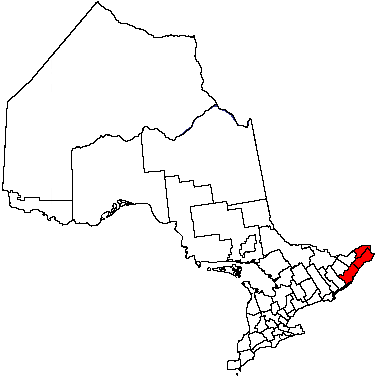

Location
- Brockville, Ontario Eastern Ontario counties: Leeds and Grenville, Stormont, Dundas, Glengarry, Prescott and Russell, Lanark County. Canada
- Coordinates: 44.59323°N 75.70263°W

District information
- Chair of the board: Jamie Schoular
- Director of education: Ron Ferguson
- Schools: 78 total; 57 elementary, 21 secondary
- Budget: CA$424 million million (Based on 2023-24 Revised Estimates)
- District ID: B66192

Students and staff
- Students: 26,701 approx; 17,686 elementary, 8,235 secondary, 780 alternative/continuing education

Other information
- Elected Trustees: Lynda Johnston (Ward 1); Carole Dufort (Ward 2); Jamie Schoular (Ward 3); John McAllister (Ward 4); Michel LaBonté (Ward 5); Lisa Swan (Ward 6); John Danaher (Ward 7); David McDonald (Ward 8); Curtis Jordan (Ward 9); Corina Parisien (Ward 10); Patty Francis (First Nations Rep.)
- Student Trustees: Alexander Moussa (Student Senate Chair); Allison Gibson (Student Senate Vice-Chair)
- Website: www.ucdsb.on.ca

The Upper Canada District School Board (UCDSB), known as English-language Public District School Board No. 26 prior to 1999) is one of the largest public school boards in Ontario in terms of geographical area, spanning 12,000 square kilometres. It encompasses the counties in the easternmost portion of the province, including the cities of Brockville, Clarence-Rockland, Carleton Place, Cornwall, and Akwesasne. It covers most of the area surrounding - but not including - the city of Ottawa. Trustee elections are held every four years to elect new trustees.

The board manages a main office in Brockville and four regional education centres, and offers alternate and continuing education at over 30 locations.

Additionally, Ahkwesahsne Mohawk Board of Education (AMBE), which operates elementary and K-8 schools on the Canadian portion of Akwesasne, has a tuition agreement to send high school students to this district.

== History ==
Efforts for an AMBE-UCDSB tuition agreement began circa 1999. They signed an agreement in 2003.

== Secondary & Elementary Schools ==
Secondary school enrollment (according to data from the Ontario Ministry of Education's School Information Finder service) and Fraser Institute provincial rankings are as follows:

UCDSB secondary schools
Name	Location	Enrollment	1-year ranking of 727	5-year ranking of 693
Almonte and District High School	Almonte	482	392	246
Athens District High School	Athens	215	566	479
Brockville Collegiate Institute	Brockville	562	79	30
Carleton Place High School	Carleton Place	684	225	301
Charlottenburgh and Lancaster District High School	Williamstown	272	309	246
Cornwall Collegiate and Vocational School	Cornwall	560	n/a	n/a
Gananoque Secondary School	Gananoque	399	566	570
Glengarry District High School	Alexandria	364	225	223
North Dundas District High School	Chesterville/Winchester	531	595	426
North Grenville District High School	Kemptville	477	197	194
Perth and District Collegiate Institute	Perth	682	547	493
Rideau District High School	Elgin	397	411	177
Rockland District High School	Rockland	359	79	130
Russell High School	Russell	362	225	165
Seaway District High School	Iroquois	371	351	265
Smiths Falls District Collegiate Institute	Smiths Falls	765	623	450
South Grenville District High School	Prescott	601	587	546
St. Lawrence High School	Cornwall	271	655	640
Tagwi Secondary School	Avonmore	420	432	523
Thousand Islands Secondary School	Brockville	1017	309	194
Vankleek Hill Collegiate Institute	Vankleek Hill	402	351	343

UCDSB elementary schools
Name

Arklan Community PS, Beckwith PS, Bridgewood PS, Caldwell Street PS, Cambridge PS, Centennial '67 PS, Chesterville PS, Chimo ES, Commonwealth PS, Drummond CS, Duncan J. Schoular PS, Eamer's Corners PS, Front of Yonge ES, Glen Tay PS, Iroquois PS, Kemptville PS, Laggan PS, Linklater PS, Lombardy PS, Longue Sault PS, Lyn PS, Maple Grove ES, Maxville PS, Maynard PS, Meadowview PS, Merrickville PS, Montague PS, Morrisburg PS, Naismith Memorial PS, Nationview PS, North Elmsley PS, North Stormont PS, Oxford-on-Rideau PS, Pakenham PS, Pineview PS, Pleasant Corners PS, Queen Elizabeth PS, R. Tait McKenzie PS, Rideau Vista PS, Rockland PS, Rothwell-Osnabruck PS, Roxmore PS, Russell PS, South Branch ES, South Crosby PS, South Edwardsburg PS, Sweet's Corners PS, The Stewart S, Thousand Islands ES, Toniata PS, Vanier PS, Viscount Alexander PS, Wellington ES, Westminster PS, Williamstown PS, Winchester PS

Additionally, the Board operates the Eastern Ontario Education and Training Centre in Hawkesbury, along with Conseil des écoles publiques de l'Est de l'Ontario and the Conseil scolaire district catholique de l'Est ontarien.

== See also ==
- Catholic District School Board of Eastern Ontario
- List of school districts in Ontario
- List of high schools in Ontario
