= Notre Dame Catholic High School (Carleton Place) =

Coordinates: 45.14301°N 76.15851°W

Notre Dame Catholic High School is located in Carleton Place, Ontario, Canada. It opened in 1995 with approximately 235 students. As of January 2021, there are over 1000 students ranging from grades 7 to 12. The school expanded in 2001 with a two-story addition. The school began an expansion to include its grade 7 and 8 students as well as a new atrium in 2015, which was completed in 2017.

== See also ==
- Education in Ontario
- List of secondary schools in Ontario
