= Athens High School (Illinois) =

Athens Senior High School

Location
- 501 Warrior Way, Athens, Illinois 62613
- Coordinates: 39°57′41″N 89°43′01″W

Information
- Type: Public High School
- School district: Community Unit School District 213
- Principal: Matt Rhoades
- Teaching staff: 23.85 (FTE)
- Grades: 9-12
- Enrollment: 321 (2023–2024)
- Student to teacher ratio: 13.46
- Colors: Kelly Green and white
- Athletics conference: Sangomo Conference
- Mascot: Warriors
- Website: http://www.athens-213.org/

Athens Senior High School (also referred to as Athens High School, AHS, and Athens Community High School) is a public school located in Athens, Illinois. It is part of Community Unit School District 213 and includes 317 students in grades 9-12. The principal is Matt Rhoades.

The Athens Senior High School mascot is the Warrior and school colors are kelly green and white. Contrary to popular belief, black is not an official school color.

== Location ==
Athens Senior High School is located in Menard county at 1 Warrior Way, Athens, IL 62613.

== Demographics ==
Race	Percentage
White	96.3%
Black	0.7%
Hispanic	0.3%
Asian	0.7%
American Indian	0.0%
Multiracial	2%
Pacific Islander	0%

== School song ==
We'll pull, pull for you team. We’re ever loyal to you.
So let's win boys let's win, to tradition let's be true.
We’re from old ACHS, from the school we all love so.
We’re backing you to win for her, let's go team let's go.

Today, "ACHS" is commonly replaced with "AHS".

== Athletics ==
=== List of IHSA (Illinois High School Association) Teams ===
- Baseball
- Basketball (Boys & Girls)
- Bass fishing
- Cheerleading
- Cross country (Boys & Girls)
- Football
- Golf
- Scholastic Bowl
- Soccer (Boys & Girls)
- Softball
- Swimming (sport)
- Track and field (Boys & Girls)
- Volleyball

=== Boys basketball ===
In December 2012, the team placed 1st at the Waverly Holiday Tournament. Team members Ryan McHenry and Nate Todd were part of the 2nd All-Tournament Team.

State Final Qualifier (4): 1924, 1926, 1927, 1937
District (7): 1922, 1924, 1925, 1926, 1927, 1929, 1930
Regional (10): 1936, 1937, 1938, 1940, 1948, 1949, 1950, 1972A, 1989A, 1994A
Sectional (5): 1924, 1926, 1927, 1937, 1941
4th (1): 1926
2nd (1): 1924

=== Bass fishing ===
Team Qualifier (4): 2009, 2010, 2010, 2011.
Sectional (3): 2009, 2010, 2011.

=== Boys cross country ===
Team Qualifier (6): 1982A, 1983A, 1984A, 1985A, 2001A, 2002A.
Regional (7): 1982A, 1983A, 1985A, 1999A, 2000A, 2001A, 2002A.
Sectional (1): 2001A.

=== Girls cross country ===
Team Qualifier (2): 2002A, 2003A.
Regional (3): 1984, 2000A, 2002A

=== Football ===
Playoff Qualifier (6): 2008-2A, 2010-2A, 2011-2A 2012-2a 2013-2a 2014-2a Quarter finals 2015-2a Quarter finals

Advanced to the state championship game after defeating Shelbyville 39–6 in the semifinal on November 18, 2023

=== Scholastic Bowl ===
In 2013, the Athens Scholastic Bowl team hosted and won their regional. In 2012, the team placed 4th at the Regional Masonic Tournament. They then went on to win their sectional.

=== Men's Track & Field ===
Track standout Ben Montgomery went to state in the Triple Jump placing 2nd with a jump of 45 feet 9.5 inches. He also went to state in the 400 Meter Dash and placed 5th. School records for the 4x400 Meter Relay, Triple Jump, 400 Meter Dash, and 4x200 are all held by Ben Montgomery. Multiple meet records were also set for the triple jump by Ben. (Graduated 2014) Jake Montgomery, brother of recently mentioned Ben Montgomery, holds the 300M Hurdle school record as well as the 110M Hurdle record. He also made finals his junior year for the 300M Hurdles.(Graduated 2014) With an average team size of around 10 athletes, it is very uncommon to see such great talent within this squad. The Montgomery twins will go down in history as the greatest track running duo Athens has ever known. In 2008, Athens did have other great talent in the form of Ben and Brian Bishop who were a throwing duo. They are known as the greatest throwers that Athens has ever known.

=== Girls volleyball ===
State Final Qualifier (2): 1976, 1979A, 2019
District (5): 1976, 1977A, 1978A, 1979A, 1980A
Regional (1): 1982A
Sectional (4): 1976, 1977A, 1978A, 1979A
Super-Sectional (2): 1976, 1979A
4th (1): 1976

== Clubs ==
=== List of active clubs ===
- Archery
- Biology Club
- Class Officer
- Drama Club
- FFA (Chapter of National FFA Organization)
- FCCLA (Family, Career and Community Leaders of America)
- Journalism Contests
- Leadership Committee
- Math Team
- National Honors Society (abbreviated "NHS")
- Poms Squad
- Show Choir
- Student Council
- Teens Making A Difference (abbreviated "TMD")
- WYSE (formally named Worldwide Youth in Science and Engineering) Team
- Yearbook
