= Athens, Ontario =

Athens
- Township (lower-tier)
- Township of Athens
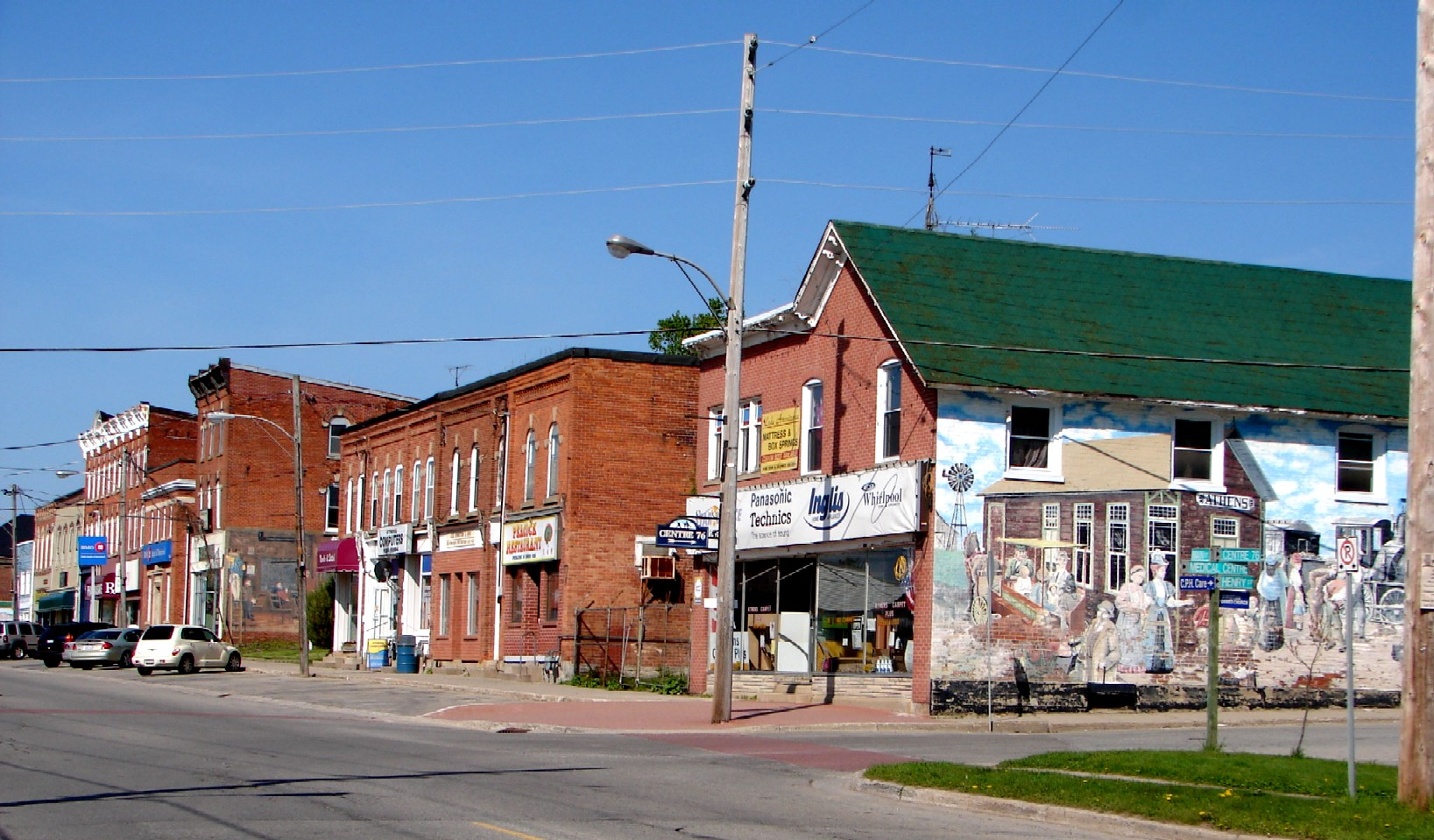
- Athens Main Street

- Location within United Counties of Leeds and Grenville Location within Southern Ontario
- Coordinates: 44°37.5′N 75°57′W
- Country: Canada
- Province: Ontario
- County: Leeds and Grenville
- Settled: 1792
- Incorporated: January 1, 2001

Government
  - Mayor: Herb Scott
  - Fed. riding: Leeds—Grenville—Thousand Islands and Rideau Lakes
  - Prov. riding: Leeds—Grenville—Thousand Islands and Rideau Lakes

Area
  - Land: 129.54 km^{2} (50.02 sq mi)

Population (2021)
  - Total: 3,042
  - Density: 23.5/km^{2} (61/sq mi)
- Time zone: UTC-5 (EST)
  - Summer (DST): UTC-4 (EDT)
- Postal Code: K0E
- Area code: 613 / 343
- Website: www.athenstownship.ca

Athens is a township in the United Counties of Leeds and Grenville in Eastern Ontario, Canada. It is located approximately 25 kilometres (16 mi) north of the St. Lawrence River, near Brockville, west of Addison, and about 90 kilometres (56 mi) south west of Ottawa. Formerly, it was a part of Yonge township before becoming Rear of Yonge and Escott with Athens as its own municipality. On January 1, 2001, the Township of Rear of Yonge and Escott amalgamated with the Village of Athens to form the new Township of Athens.

Each year, a summer fair is held, called "Cornfest". This fair celebrates the harvest of corn and is held on the 3rd Saturday of August annually. Another celebration that is held each year is called the "Farmersville Exhibition", and is also known as "Steam Fair." This fair celebrates the agricultural heritage of the town, and includes steam engines and antique tractors. This takes place in July.

Athens has its own high school Athens District High School, which is under the Upper Canada District School Board, as well as a live entertainment venue Joshua Bates Centre which features a series of live musical performances each year.

== Communities ==
Aside from Athens, the township consists of the communities of: Anoma Lea, Beales Mills, Charleston, Glen Elbe, Glen Morris, Hayes Corners, Wiltsetown. The township administrative offices are located in Athens.

=== Athens (designated place) ===
Athens is recognized as a designated place by Statistics Canada.

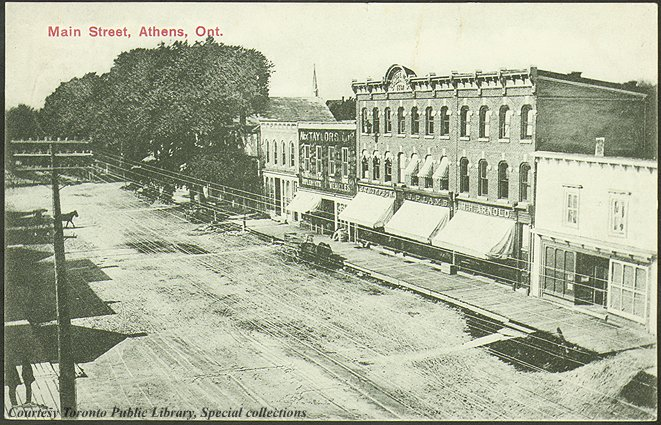
Athens, 1910

Formerly known as Farmersville, Benoni Wiltse, a United Empire Loyalist, and his brothers settled in the town of Athens in 1792. Farmersville was renamed to Athens in 1888 by Arza Parish in honour of Athens, Greece, because it was an educational centre with grammar school, a model school for teacher training, and a high school. Athens' post office was named in 1890. Currently, the town of Athens is known for a series of large outdoor murals depicting historical local life, painted on the sides of various buildings.

In the 2021 Census of Population conducted by Statistics Canada, Athens had a population of 974 living in 420 of its 438 total private dwellings, a change of −0.8% from its 2016 population of 982. With a land area of 2.12 km^{2} (0.82 sq mi), it had a population density of 459.4/km^{2} (1,189.9/sq mi) in 2021.

=== Beales Mills ===
Beales Mills, Ontario is a small settlement located southwest of the town of Athens, close to Charleston. The community was settled around the mid-19th century by a Benjamin Beale for whom the settlement was named. Beale established a sawmill, gristmill, and a flour mill along the creek located through the settlement, now known as Beales Creek, as well as a shingle manufacturing business.

The community relied on the nearby hamlet of Charleston for most of its needs, such as a post office, however Charleston relied on Beales Mills to supply water power to most of its businesses. Eventually, around the 1900s, the settlement began to decline as the mills closed. Presently, the site of Beales Mills consists of a few residential buildings most of which are modern. The ruins of a stone mill and dam can still be seen today. The settlement is largely considered a ghost town.

== Demographics ==
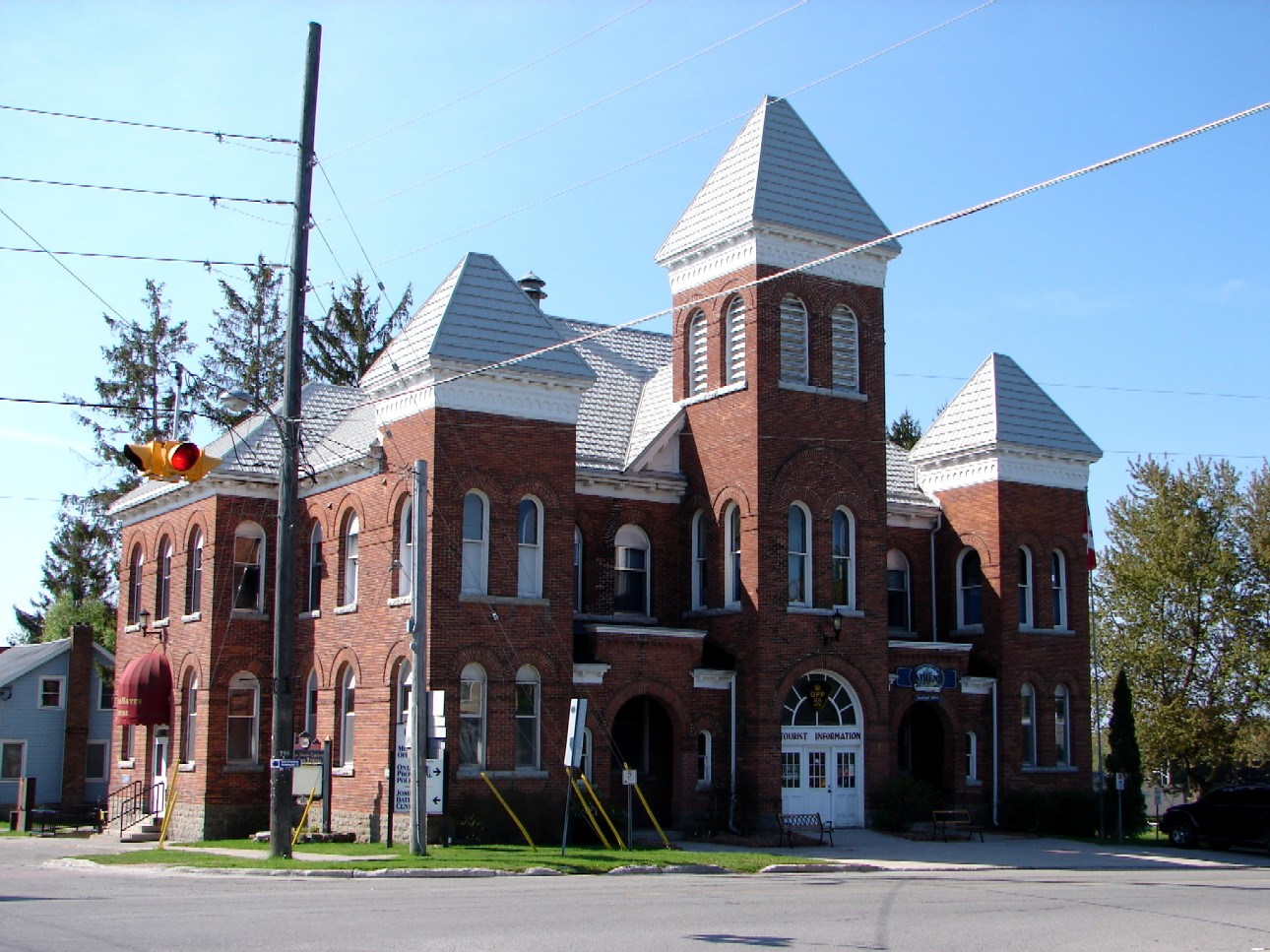
Athens Town Hall

In the 2021 Census of Population conducted by Statistics Canada, Athens had a population of 3,042 living in 1,214 of its 1,325 total private dwellings, a change of 0.8% from its 2016 population of 3,018. With a land area of 129.54 km^{2} (50.02 sq mi), it had a population density of 23.5/km^{2} (60.8/sq mi) in 2021.

Canada census – Athens community profile

	2021	2016	2011
Population	3,042 (+0.8% from 2016)	3,013 (-3.4% from 2011)	3,118 (1.0% from 2006)
Land area	129.54 km^{2} (50.02 sq mi)	127.88 km^{2} (49.37 sq mi)	127.77 km^{2} (49.33 sq mi)
Population density	23.5/km^{2} (61/sq mi)	23.6/km^{2} (61/sq mi)	24.4/km^{2} (63/sq mi)
Median age	50.8 (M: 50.8, F: 50.8)	47.4 (M: 47.3, F: 47.4)	44.1 (M: 43.9, F: 44.4)
Private dwellings	1,325 (total) 1,214 (occupied)	1,336 (total)	1,268 (total)
Median household income	$85,000	$71,936	$63,754

References: 2021 2016 2011

Historical census populations – Athens, Ontario

Year	Pop.	±%
1871	1,791	—
1881	2,103	+17.4%
1891	2,317	+10.2%
1901	2,229	−3.8%
1911	1,947	−12.7%
1921	1,769	−9.1%
1931	1,713	−3.2%
1941	1,597	−6.8%

Year	Pop.	±%
1951	1,694	+6.1%
1956	1,907	+12.6%
1961	1,968	+3.2%
1966	1,979	+0.6%
1971	2,057	+3.9%
1976	2,269	+10.3%
1981	2,354	+3.7%
1986	2,440	+3.7%

Year	Pop.	±%
1991	2,829	+15.9%
1996	3,040	+7.5%
2001	3,053	+0.4%
2006	3,086	+1.1%
2011	3,118	+1.0%
2016	3,018	−3.2%
2021	3,042	+0.8%

2016 Population figure based on revised count. Population amounts prior to 2001 are total of Athens village and Rear of Yonge and Escott township.
Source: Statistics Canada

Mother tongue (2021):

- English as first language: 95.6%
- French as first language: 1.3%
- English and French as first language: 0.5%
- Other as first language: 2.0%

== Cemeteries ==
The township of Athens is home to several old burying grounds or cemeteries. Some of these cemeteries include: Barber Cemetery, an unregistered cemetery in Charleston called Charleston Village Cemetery, Temperance Lake Cemetery, Kincaid's Corners Cemetery, Holmes Cemetery, Lake Eloida Cemetery and an abandoned and unnamed pioneer cemetery. In the settlement of Wiltsetown, there is a cemetery called Wiltse Pioneer Cemetery that was established around 1795. Wiltse Pioneer Cemetery holds close to 300 interments, most of which are unmarked or marked by field stones instead of engraved tombstones.

In the town of Athens, there is a Roman Catholic cemetery called St. Denis Roman Catholic Cemetery, as well as a non-denominational community cemetery. The community of Glen Elbe has its own cemetery which is no longer is use, but maintained by its own board. This cemetery dates to around 1840.

East of Athens there is a Quaker cemetery simply called Quaker Cemetery which was established in the 1830s; this cemetery is no longer in use but is maintained by the township. Most of the stones here are badly deteriorated with only two being legible.

East of Athens along Highway 42 is a mass gravesite associated with the House of Industry as it operated from 1895 until 1946 housing the sick, elderly or poor. The gravesite is currently marked by a large stone simply reading "Pioneers of Leeds & Grenville 1895 – 1946". The original plans for the burial site included space for over 480 individuals in specific areas of the site, however, it is unclear if these plans were ever followed. Over one hundred graves are located here, of those who lived at the House of Industry between the aforementioned years and whose bodies remained unclaimed after death. For many years it was unclear where the graves were precisely located, as absolutely no records were kept and no grave markers were placed at the time. The mass grave became abandoned in 1946 when the House of Industry came under new management, who deemed the burial practices being used as undignified. A plot was then reserved in Glen Elbe cemetery for the unclaimed dead. In recent years, the long-neglected cemetery has been cleaned up and a fence was built around the stone memorial. A cooperative effort between local genealogical societies has recently discovered the approximate boundaries of the burial plot by dowsing for grave sites.

== Notable person ==
- Leonora King, the first Canadian doctor to work in China

== Notable place ==
- Vimy Oak Legacy Tree. After the battle of Vimy Ridge in 1917, Lieutenant Leslie Miller gathered acorns from Vimy Ridge and planted them in Athens. Several of these trees are still standing and were repatriated back to France for the centennial events.

== See also ==
- List of municipalities in Ontario
- List of townships in Ontario
