= Perth and District Collegiate Institute =

Coordinates: 44.9049°N 76.2506°W

Perth & District Collegiate Institute

Location
- 13 Victoria Street; Perth, Ontario K7H 2H3; Canada

Information
- Former names: Perth Collegiate Institute, Perth High School, Perth Grammar School
- School type: Secondary
- Motto: Palmam Qui Meruit Ferat (Let Whoever Earns the Palm Bear It)
- Opened: 1876
- School board: Upper Canada District School Board
- Area trustee: William MacPherson
- School number: 935050
- Principal: Val Horsfall
- Grades: 7–12
- Enrollment: 750
- Average class size: 25
- Hours in school day: 8:00 AM – 2:10 PM
- Colours: blue, white
- Mascot: Dev
- Team name: Blue Devils
- Yearbook: Lamplighter
- Website: perth.ucdsb.on.ca

Perth & District Collegiate Institute (PDCI), or more commonly referred to as "PD", is the oldest secondary school in the town of Perth, Ontario. It is part of the Upper Canada District School Board. PDCI was previously known as Perth Collegiate Institute (PCI), Perth High School, and Perth Grammar School. It is located at 13 Victoria Street, Perth, Ontario, K7H 2H3.

The school facilities include a science lab, art room, drama room, music room, gymnasium, football field, running track, auto shop, wood shop, weight room, fitness centre, cafeteria, auditorium, library, smartboard equipped classrooms, computer labs and a multimedia centre.

== History ==
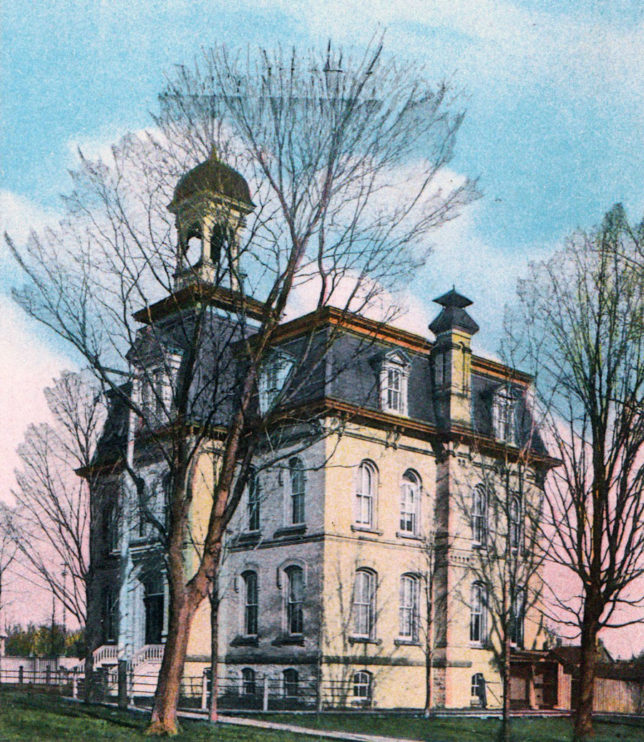
Perth Collegiate Institute, c.1876

In 1875 (prior to its raising), the school board faced much opposition from the public about the cost of the new school ($16,000.00), and that it would be far cheaper to build a new addition onto the public school. The school board trustees continued to advocate for the building, and after a brief time, they made it happen.

Perth High School opened in 1876. Initially there were three teachers who taught English, History, the Classics and Modern Languages. The first principal, Mr. F.L. Mitchell, M.A. taught mathematics and science. Enrollment that first year varied between 150 and 175. In 1886, a football field was built at the back of the school by the senior Form IV under the direction of William Rathwell, the principal. One year later in 1887, a separate wooden gymnasium was built. This was the first gymnasium and contained the basic apparatus. A larger gymnasium and two well equipped science rooms were added in 1915. In 1921 a Commercial Department with a class of 18 was established. A new wing was complete in 1925 which provided greater laboratory space and four new classrooms. The cost ran around $32,000.00. The enrollment at this time was approximately 300. In 1928 a special one-year secretarial business course was offered.

During WWII, many students who lived beyond a reasonable walking distance couldn't attend school unless their families could afford lodging during the week. This was due to no bussing from Perth to rural Lanark County.

Since then two considerably larger additions have been built. The first of these in 1959 (at a cost of $700,000.00), adding sixteen classrooms and a contemporary gymnasium, a cafeteria, kitchen, a large 662-seat auditorium, projection room and a foyer. The school became a district high school serving an area of a thirty-mile radius. It was then that Perth Collegiate Institute became Perth & District Collegiate Institute.

In 1967 the Tech Wing and Commercial Department were added (named the "Centennial Wing"). In 1972, the resource centre was built. The original building was also completely demolished, and the Home Economics, Music, Art and Theatre Arts rooms were added. In 1976, the enrollment of PDCI was 1,143 students and there were eighty courses offered, covering five levels of instruction.

In 1977, PDCI competed on Reach for the Top (a CBC academic quiz show), and won against Smiths Falls 235–130. They then competed against Brockville to go to the St. Lawrence finals, but lost 285–175.

In 2008, the school auditorium was named "Carolee & Geoff Mason Auditorium", in honour of Carolee's 27 years as PDCI's drama teacher, as well as her husband Geoff's contributions to theatre over the years.

In Summer 2014, 10 classrooms on the second floor were designated for Grade 7/8 students who would be joining the school that Fall, and Gym 3 was also retrofitted for them as well. The main office (which was on the second floor) was relocated to a portion of the library area on the first floor, and half the space would remain the library/learning commons. In Summer 2015, an elevator was installed, helping the school meet more of the accessibility standards, and the new main entrance was made more noticeable.

In Summer 2017, all the exterior doors and windows were replaced, as well as the front steps/wheelchair ramp, and new signage for the two main entrances. The parking lot was also resurfaced, along with some indoor updates to the floors, ceilings, and paint.

== Athletics ==
PDCI has a rich sports history, dating back to the schools' infancy. Some of the sports included Basketball, Hockey, Rugby/Football, and Track. Currently, PDCI offers many sports. Some include (but are not limited to) Football, Basketball, Soccer, Volleyball, Track & Field, Badminton, Snowboarding, Golf, Tennis, and Cross-Country.

=== Mascot and Team Name ===
PDCI's sports teams are known as the "Blue Devils", and have been since the 1950s. Previously, they were briefly known as the "Black Hawks" in the 1930s, and also simply as "PCI Athletics". Their current mascot is Dev Blue, a blue devil.

=== Colours ===
PDCI's school colours are blue and white, and sometimes accented with black.

== Reunion ==
In 2016 (coinciding with the town of Perth's bi-centennial celebrations), PDCI held a school reunion (dubbed "Raisin' the Devil"), commemorating 140 years of education. PDCI has held two other reunions previously, in 1989 and 2000.

Announced in 2015, former student and alum Vivian Monroe (Class of 1959) decided that rather than just having her yearly get-together with around thirty classmates from her graduating year, she would plan an event that included all PDCI alumni. As part of the celebration, tours of the school were available on Saturday (23 July) and a display of memorabilia and yearbooks was put together.

== Specialist High Skills Major (SHSM) ==
PDCI currently has seven Specialist High Skills Major (SHSM) programs which are in the following economic sectors: Arts & Culture, Business, Non-Profit, Sports, Transportation Technology, Horticulture and Landscaping and Information and Communications Technology.

== PDCI Livestream ==
PDCI's Media Arts class deals with video productions which follow Blue Devils School Sports and Events through Facebook's live feature, on their designated page. The idea was conceptualized in Fall 2016, but made a reality in Fall 2017 through trial and error. The first broadcast was of a Senior Girls volleyball game between PDCI Blue Devils and SFDCI Redhawks on Thursday, 14 December 2017. Perth won 25–19.

== Notable alumni ==
=== Politicians ===
- Donald McNaughton, Canadian general
- James Joseph McCann, politician
- George McIlraith, politician
- William Richard Motherwell, politician
- Kirk Wagar, politician
- Roy Kellock, Canadian judge

=== Athletes ===
- Les Douglas, NHL Forward – Detroit Red Wings, winner of one Stanley Cup
- Tony Licari, NHL Forward – Detroit Red Wings
- Floyd Smith, NHL Forward – Boston Bruins, New York Rangers, Detroit Red Wings, Toronto Maple Leafs, Buffalo Sabres; NHL Coach – Buffalo Sabres, Toronto Maple Leafs; WHA Coach – Cincinnati Stingers, NHL General Manager – Toronto Maple Leafs
- Gord Smith, NHL Defenceman – Washington Capitals and Winnipeg Jets
- Billy Smith, NHL Goalie – Los Angeles Kings and New York Islanders, winner of four Stanley Cups, Conn Smythe Trophy winner and Member of the Hockey Hall of Fame
- Dan Wicklum, CFL Linebacker – Calgary Stampeders and Winnipeg Blue Bombers, winner of one Grey Cup
- Mike Brown, 2004 and 2008 Olympic Swimming
- Sultana Frizell, 2008 and 2012 Olympic Hammer Throw
- Nick Tritton, 2008 and 2012 Olympic Judo

== See also ==
- Education in Ontario
- List of secondary schools in Ontario
