= Rideau District High School =

Secondary school in Elgin, Ontario, Canada

Coordinates: 44.6150°N 76.2099°W

Location
- 251 Main Street; Elgin, Ontario K0G 1E0; Canada

Information
- School type: Secondary
- Motto: Vincit Omnia Veritas (Truth Conquers All)
- Founded: 1960
- School board: Upper Canada District School Board
- Principal: Trevor Holme
- Grades: 7-12
- Hours in school day: 8:00 AM - 2:10 PM
- Colours: green, gold
- Team name: Lions
- Yearbook: Curtain Calls
- Website: rideaudhs.ucdsb.on.ca

Rideau District High School (RDHS), or more commonly referred to as "Rideau", is a secondary school located in the village of Elgin, Ontario. It is part of the Upper Canada District School Board. It is located at 251 Main Street, Elgin, Ontario, K0G 1E0.

== History ==
Rideau District High School was founded September 1, 1960. For a brief time (while construction of the new school was underway), the Elgin Continuation School was used as the building to house the students attending, and by fall of 1961, the school was officially opened.

In 1961, the school crest was designed by Isabel McLeod, wife of the school's first principal, John Colin McLeod.

In 2010, the school held a 50th anniversary reunion.

In 2020, the countdown for the school's 60th reunion began (January 29). Although it was originally scheduled for May 15 and 16, the reunion was postponed due to the COVID-19 pandemic.

== The Rideau Crest ==
- The crest has two colours: green and gold.
- In the top section of the crest, there is a curtain which represents the meaning of the French word "Rideau", the name of the school district.
- The Latin word for curtain is "Aulaeum" which was the name chosen for the first yearbook.
- The four emblazoned stars symbolize each of the original four schools which made up the school district: Elgin, Lyndhurst, Seeley's Bay, and Westport.
- At the top left, a "Lamp" signifies learning, and on the right, the "Wreath of Laurel" can be found which is a time-honoured symbol of glory and great achievement.
- The set of double lines which run through the centre of the crest represent the Rideau Canal, which flows through the municipality; Elgin is located at a turning point along the canal route.
- A lion can be found in the lower section of the crest, which represents kingly virtues, strength of the body, greatness, character, and generosity.
- The base scroll contains the Latin words "Vincit Omnia Veritas", which in English means "Truth Conquers All", or more literally "Truth Prevails".

== Specialist High Skills Major (SHSM) ==
The SHSM is a specialized, ministry-approved program that allows students to focus their learning on a specific economic sector while meeting the requirements of the Ontario Secondary School Diploma (OSSD). These programs enable students to gain sector-specific skills and knowledge in engaging, career-related learning environments, and prepare in a focused way for graduation and postsecondary education, training, or employment. SHSMs assist students in their transition from secondary school to apprenticeship training, college, university, or the workplace.

Rideau has four Specialist High Skills Major (SHSM) programs which are in the following economic sectors: Arts & Culture, Construction, Environment, and Health & Wellness.

== See also ==
- Education in Ontario
- List of secondary schools in Ontario
