= Crash position indicator =

Radio beacon

The crash position indicator (CPI) is a radio beacon designed to be ejected from an aircraft when it crashes. This helps ensure it survives the crash and any post-crash fires or sinking, allowing it to broadcast a homing signal to search and rescue aircraft.

CPI's became a requirement on some military aircraft and were often combined with flight data recorders. Today the beacon functions are normally fulfilled by the emergency locator transmitter system. The term "crash position indicator" no longer refers to the specific device, but any locator beacon. The CPI is ranked No. 48 in the list of the 50 Greatest Canadian Inventions.

== History ==
=== Harry Stevinson ===
The CPI was developed by Harry Stevinson, who started work on the concept just before the opening of World War II. After the war, he joined the National Research Council's (NRC) National Aeronautical Establishment (NAE), testing glider performance.

While these tests were ongoing, a jet fighter happened to crash. The aircraft had no beacon, and thus the rescue plane sent to find the fighter was forced to fly low over wooded areas in an attempt to locate the wreck. The rescue plane's low flight led to its own crash in the bush. With a beacon, the rescue aircraft would have been able to stay at much higher, and safer, altitudes. Stevinson decided that the beacon was more important than glider research, and was able to convince the NRC to develop the concept.

Other rescue beacon systems had already been developed and deployed, but Stevinson felt these were insufficient. If the crash occurred over water, the beacon would sink with the aircraft even if the crew escaped and were on the surface. Over land, the aircraft itself would block the signal if the beacon ended up buried under the fuselage, and the crash and any post-crash fires had the possibility of destroying it.

There was one contemporary system that offered survivability. It used a small mortar to fire the beacon of the aircraft and then land it under parachute with a shock absorber to lessen impact with the ground. The beacon package included a folding antenna, two pop-out arms intended to orient it upright after landing on the ground, and a floatation bag for water.

=== CPI development ===
Stevinson liked the idea, but not the implementation. He preferred an aerodynamic release system that would eliminate the mortar, and a ruggedized radio system with an omnidirectional antenna that would eliminate the rest of the complexity. Survivability on both land and water could be achieved using lightweight foams.

The key, however, was to make an aerodynamic system that would pull the system away from an aircraft quickly, but then slow the CPI down once it was released. Working with David Makow, Stevinson came up with the idea of using a Frisbee-shaped package, built a model out of paper, and dropped it off the balcony. When it exhibited a tumbling motion, a second model was built of aluminum and released from the window of a car. As hoped, the tumbling quickly slowed the package to safe speeds. The team then started work on a radio-clear version using fiberglass reinforced plastic.

While they worked on the design, the Division of Electrical Engineering was working on a production radio system. After about two years of development, everything was ready and the first experimental CPI was assembled. Among the many tests, early examples were fired on a rocket sled at speeds up to 370 km/h off the top of a cliff formed by a former gravel pit.

These tests were followed by production-setting releases from aircraft. In this case, the CPI was placed inside a cylindrical recess on the outside of the aircraft fuselage, normally near the tail. The upper curved portion of the CPI projected into the wind, providing a constant lift when the aircraft was in motion. This was countered by a spring latch that would automatically release in the case of a sudden deceleration.

=== Commercial production ===
When development was completed in 1959, production did not start immediately. Licenses were passed from company to company before finally settling at Dominion Scientific Instruments (DSI) of Ottawa. They contracted Leigh Instruments of Carleton Place to manufacture the system.

CPI was soon mandatory on Canadian Air Force aircraft working in the far north. In one instance, an aircraft in the Yukon mountains was found by CPI in a location where visual location would have been impossible. In another, a USAF aircraft crashed into the ocean at night, but its injured crew was rescued after the CPI broadcast was detected. Leigh received a letter of thanks. Even Air Force One was equipped with a CPI, the AN/ASH-20.

=== ARL's flight memory ===
While Stevinson was working on the "tumbling aerofoil beacon", David Warren of the Aeronautical Research Laboratories (ARL), Australia's counterpart to the Canadian NAE, was developing the concept of the cockpit voice recorder under the name "Flight Memory". In 1958 he visited the NRC to discuss the possibility of incorporating the Flight Memory system into the CPI.

At the time, Warren's device had not been built, and when they finally had a unit ready for testing in 1962, they found that DSI had already developed a "very nice" system providing "voice, time, and 96 data channels … on ¼ inch tape." Surprised by this development, ARL nevertheless requested one of the airframes, and showed it with Flight Memory at a trade show in 1963.

DSI's system would go on to spawn a series of models, some in CPI's and some in ruggedized crash-survivable forms.

=== Commercial success, business failure ===
By the 1970s, the CPI with data recorder was now a standard item on many Canadian and US aircraft, and would also be selected for the Panavia Tornado. It was optional on many other aircraft, and fairly common on bush planes. Its success was such that Leigh eventually purchased DSI, and by 1978 yearly sales of modern CPI devices were $6 million. Total sales over the years topped $100 million. Leigh became one of the largest Canadian electronics firms.

In 1988, Plessey announced they would purchase Leigh for about 42.5 million Pounds. This was most of the money Plessey received from GEC during the creation of GEC Plessey Telecommunications. However, the deal fell through and the company was eventually broken up.

Although most aircraft carry non-ejectable beacons, ejectable versions are still built for overwater flight, and most of these feature the tumbling airfoil design.
