= Carleton Place =

- Town (lower-tier)
- Town of Carleton Place
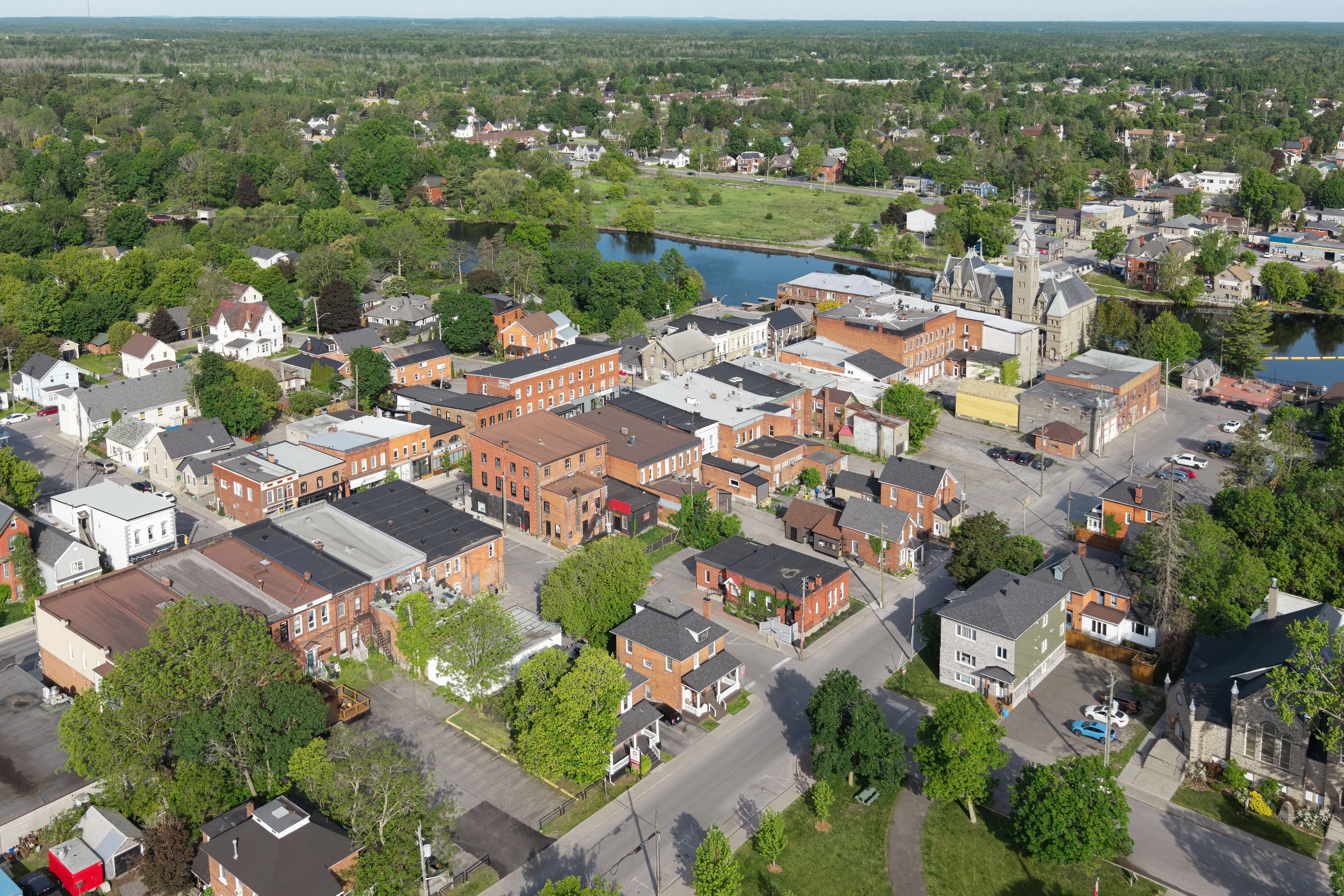
- Downtown (2026)

- Coat of arms
- Motto: Fidelis (Latin for "faithful")
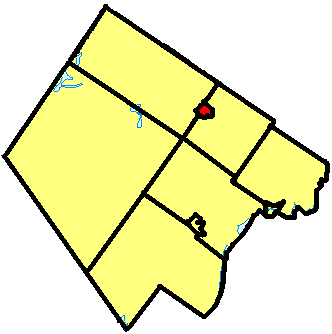
- Location of Carleton Place in Lanark County

- Carleton Place in southern Ontario
- Coordinates: 45°08′N 76°08′W
- Country: Canada
- Province: Ontario
- County: Lanark
- Settled: 1819
- Incorporated: 1870 (village)
- Incorporated: 1890 (town)

Government
  - Mayor: Toby Randell
  - MP: Scott Reid (Lanark—Frontenac—Kingston, CPC)
  - MPP: John Jordan (Lanark—Frontenac—Kingston, Prog. Cons.)

Area
  - Land: 9.94 km^{2} (3.84 sq mi)

Population (2021)
  - Total: 12,517
  - Density: 1,259.4/km^{2} (3,262/sq mi)
- Time zone: UTC-5 (EST)
  - Summer (DST): UTC-4 (EDT)
- Postal Code FSA: K7C
- Area codes: 613, 343, 753
- Website: www.carletonplace.ca

Carleton Place is a town in Eastern Ontario, Canada, in Lanark County, about 55 kilometres (34 mi) west of downtown Ottawa. It is located at the crossroads of Highway 15 and Highway 7, halfway between the towns of Perth, Almonte, Smiths Falls, and the nation's capital, Ottawa. Canada's Mississippi River, a tributary of the Ottawa River flows through the town. Mississippi Lake is just upstream by boat, as well as by car.

The town is situated on the edge of a large limestone plain, just south of the edge of the Canadian Shield in the deciduous forest ecoregion of North America.

== History ==
Carleton Place was first settled by Europeans when British authorities prompted immigration to Lanark County in the early 19th century. The Morphy and Moore families were among the first to arrive. Edmond Morphy chose the site in 1819 when he realized there was potential in the area's waterfall. He built a mill there and was the first of many such textile and lumber industries to locate in the area. The settlement was then known as Morphy's Falls.

In 1829, the area was renamed Carleton Place (a name by local merchant Alexander Morris), after a street in Glasgow, Scotland, when a post office was constructed. In November 1870, it separated from Beckwith Township and became an incorporated village, and a town in 1890. The community's economic growth was enabled by the construction of the Brockville and Ottawa Railway later in the century. The town was also renowned for its access to Mississippi Lake, and had steamship service to Innisville on the west end of Mississippi Lake between the 1860s and 1920s.

== Demographics ==
In the 2021 Census of Population conducted by Statistics Canada, Carleton Place had a population of 12,517 living in 5,210 of its 5,341 total private dwellings, a change of 17.6% from its 2016 population of 10,644. Statistics Canada cited Carleton Place as the fastest growing municipality in Canada in 2021. With a land area of 9.94 km^{2} (3.84 sq mi), it had a population density of 1,259.3/km^{2} (3,261.5/sq mi) in 2021.

Canada census – Carleton Place community profile

	2021	2016	2011
Population	12,517 (+17.6% from 2016)	10,644 (+8.5% from 2011)	9,809 (+3.8% from 2006)
Land area	9.94 km^{2} (3.84 sq mi)	9.05 km^{2} (3.49 sq mi)	8.83 km^{2} (3.41 sq mi)
Population density	1,259.4/km^{2} (3,262/sq mi)	1,176.2/km^{2} (3,046/sq mi)	1,110.3/km^{2} (2,876/sq mi)
Median age	41.6 (M: 40.0, F: 43.2)	42.3 (M: 40.3, F: 44.2)
Private dwellings	5,341 (total) 5,210 (occupied)	4,403 (total)	4,246 (total)
Median household income	$89,000	$71,481

References: 2021 2016 2011

Historical census populations – Carleton Place

Year	Pop.	±%
1871	1,205	—
1881	1,975	+63.9%
1891	4,435	+124.6%
1901	4,059	−8.5%
1911	3,621	−10.8%
1921	3,841	+6.1%
1931	4,105	+6.9%
1941	4,305	+4.9%

Year	Pop.	±%
1951	4,725	+9.8%
1956	4,790	+1.4%
1961	4,796	+0.1%
1966	4,819	+0.5%
1971	5,020	+4.2%
1976	5,265	+4.9%
1981	5,626	+6.9%
1986	6,541	+16.3%

Year	Pop.	±%
1991	7,432	+13.6%
1996	8,450	+13.7%
2001	9,083	+7.5%
2006	9,453	+4.1%
2011	9,809	+3.8%
2016	10,644	+8.5%
2021	12,517	+17.6%

Population counts are not adjusted for boundary changes.
Source: Statistics Canada

== Economy ==
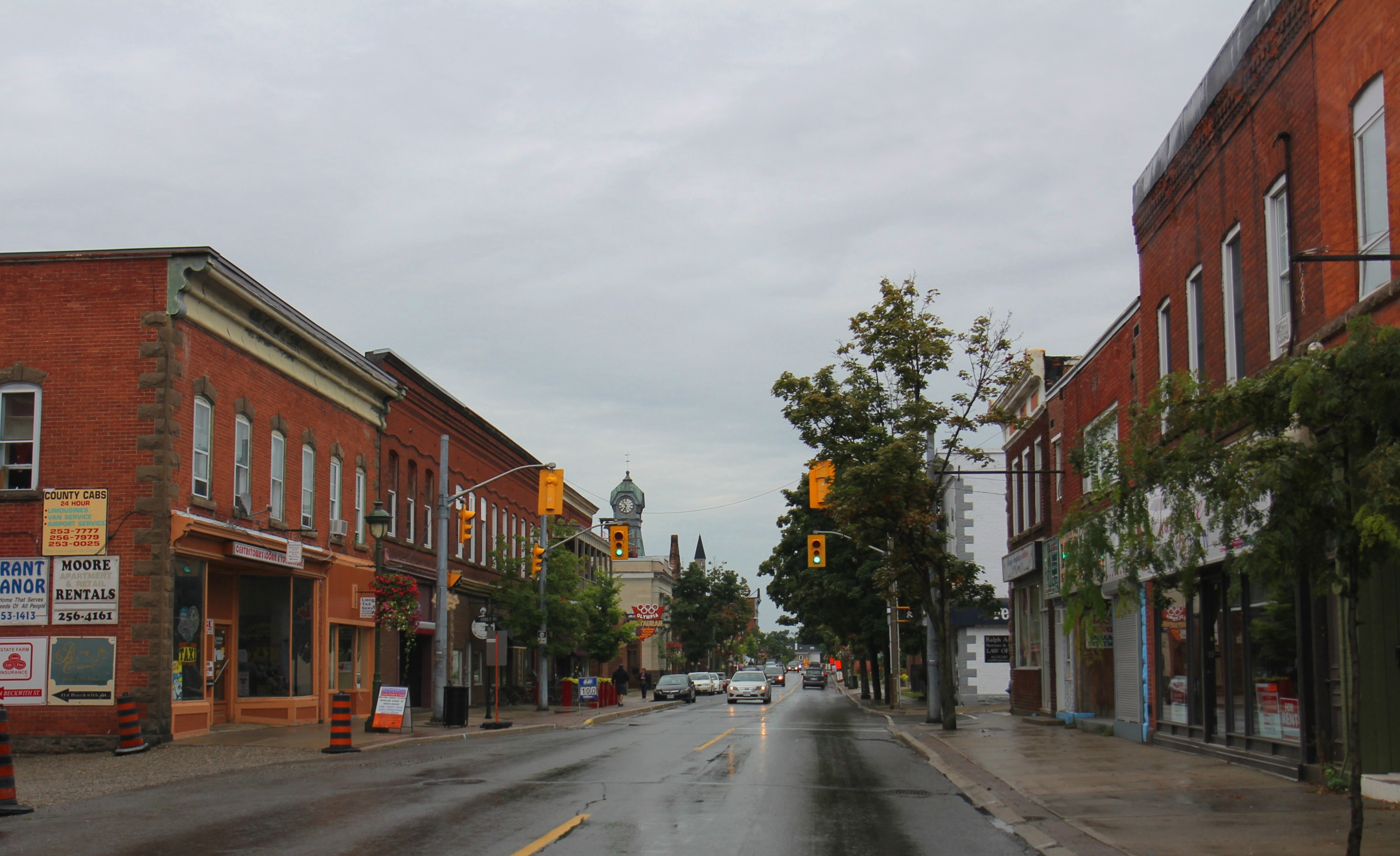
Carleton Place downtown

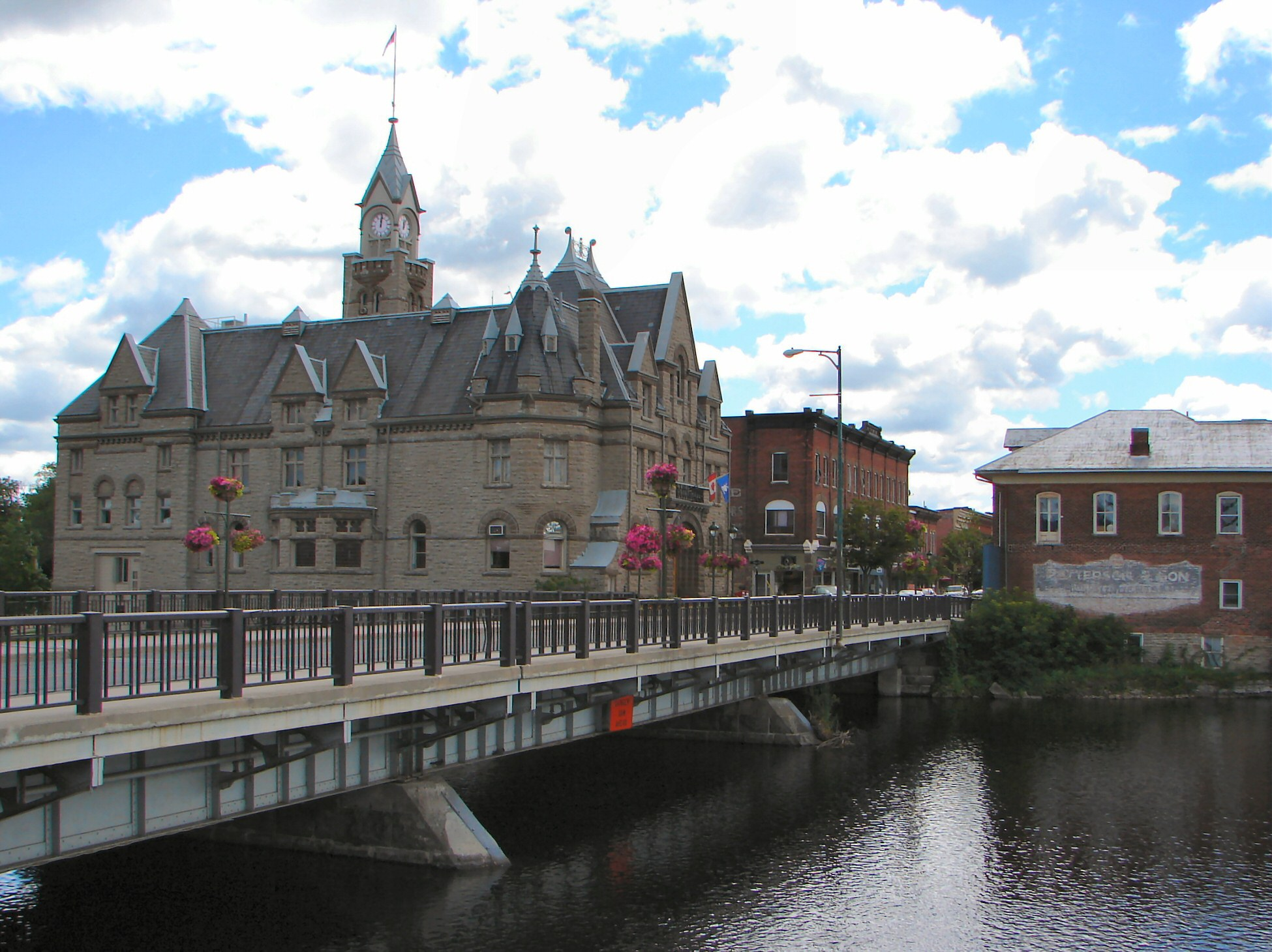
Carleton Place Town Hall and Mississippi River

The logging industry stimulated economic development in the 19th century, with white pine logs exported to Europe. Local forests were depleted of hemlock to provide bark for the leather tanning industry. Both textile and lumber mills flourished, but none still operates. "The Findlay Foundry", founded by David Findlay in 1862, operated until 1974, making cast-iron cookware and woodstoves. Some of the designs created by this company are still being made by another company. Today, the remaining mill buildings house condominiums and high-tech industry. The "Crash Position Indicator" (CPI) was manufactured and marketed in Carleton Place by Leigh Instruments Ltd.

== Education ==
The Upper Canada District School Board manages public education in Carleton Place and Lanark County, while the Catholic District School Board of Eastern Ontario is in charge of schools teaching the Catholic curriculum. Schools in the Carleton Place area include:

- Carleton Place High School
- Notre Dame Catholic High School

== Notable residents ==
- Roy Brown, RAF pilot credited with shooting down the Red Baron
- D'Alton Corry Coleman, president of the Canadian Pacific Railway
- David Cooney, Juno Award-winning folk-rock musician, a founding member of the band Waltons
- Ryan Cuthbert, sprint kayaker, 2 time Olympian (2004 Sydney Olympics(k-4 1000m), 2008 Beijing Olympics(k-2 1000m))
- Shean Donovan, professional ice hockey player (retired), who last played for the Ottawa Senators.
- John Edwards, sprint canoer, Olympian (1972 Munich Olympics), (1976 Montreal Olympics)
- Jill Heinerth, cave diver and explorer
- Eddie MacCabe, sports editor of the Ottawa Journal and the Ottawa Citizen
- Leslie McFarlane, wrote many of the original Hardy Boys books under the pen name Franklin W. Dixon
- Jordan McIntosh, pop-country musician, 2014 Country Music Association of Ontario Rising Star Award Recipient and 2015 Canadian Country Music Association Rising Star Award Nominee
- Bat Phillips, professional ice hockey player for the Montreal Maroons
- Andrew Willows, sprint kayaker, 2 time Olympian (2004 Athens Olympics(k-4 1000m), 2008 Beijing Olympics(k-2 500m))

== Sister cities ==
Carleton Place is an active participant in the Sister Cities program and has a relationship with the following municipalities:

- Franklin, Tennessee, United States (2008)
- Comrie, Scotland, United Kingdom

== See also ==
- Carleton Place Airport
- List of francophone communities in Ontario
- List of towns in Ontario
- List of population centres in Ontario
- Carleton Place Canadians
- Carleton Place Jr. Canadians

== Sources ==
- Statistics Canada 2006 Community Profile – Carleton Place retrieved 2007-11-02
- Local History retrieved 2011/06/09
- Step forward for condos and farmers market as demolition begins retrieved 2011/06/09
- Death knell for Ottawa Valley rail line retrieved 2011/06/09
