= Seaway District High School =

Location
- P.O. Box 100, 2 Beach Street; Iroquois, Canada, Ontario; 44.85031°N 75.31465°W

Information
- School district: Upper Canada District School Board
- Principal: Mr. Geoff Trasuk
- Grades: 7 to 12
- Average class size: 27
- Campus: No
- Colours: Orange, Black
- Team name: Spartans
- Tuition: None
- Website: http://www.ucdsb.on.ca/school/sda/Pages/default.aspx

Seaway District High School is a small, rural secondary school in Iroquois, Ontario, Canada, a community within the township of South Dundas. The high school has an enrollment of approximately 400 students. It opened in 1957 as South Dundas District High School after the relocation of the town of Iroquois in the 1950s. The school was expanded in the mid-1960s and students from Morrisburg Collegiate Institute moved to the rechristened Seaway District High School in the fall of 1967. Some students from Mountain High School began attending Seaway in 1970. Seaway celebrated its 50th anniversary in 2017. The school takes its name from the Saint Lawrence Seaway.

== See also ==
- Education in Ontario
- List of secondary schools in Ontario
