= Scotch Corners Wetland =

Wetland Area in Ontario

Coordinates: 45°05′N 76°13′W

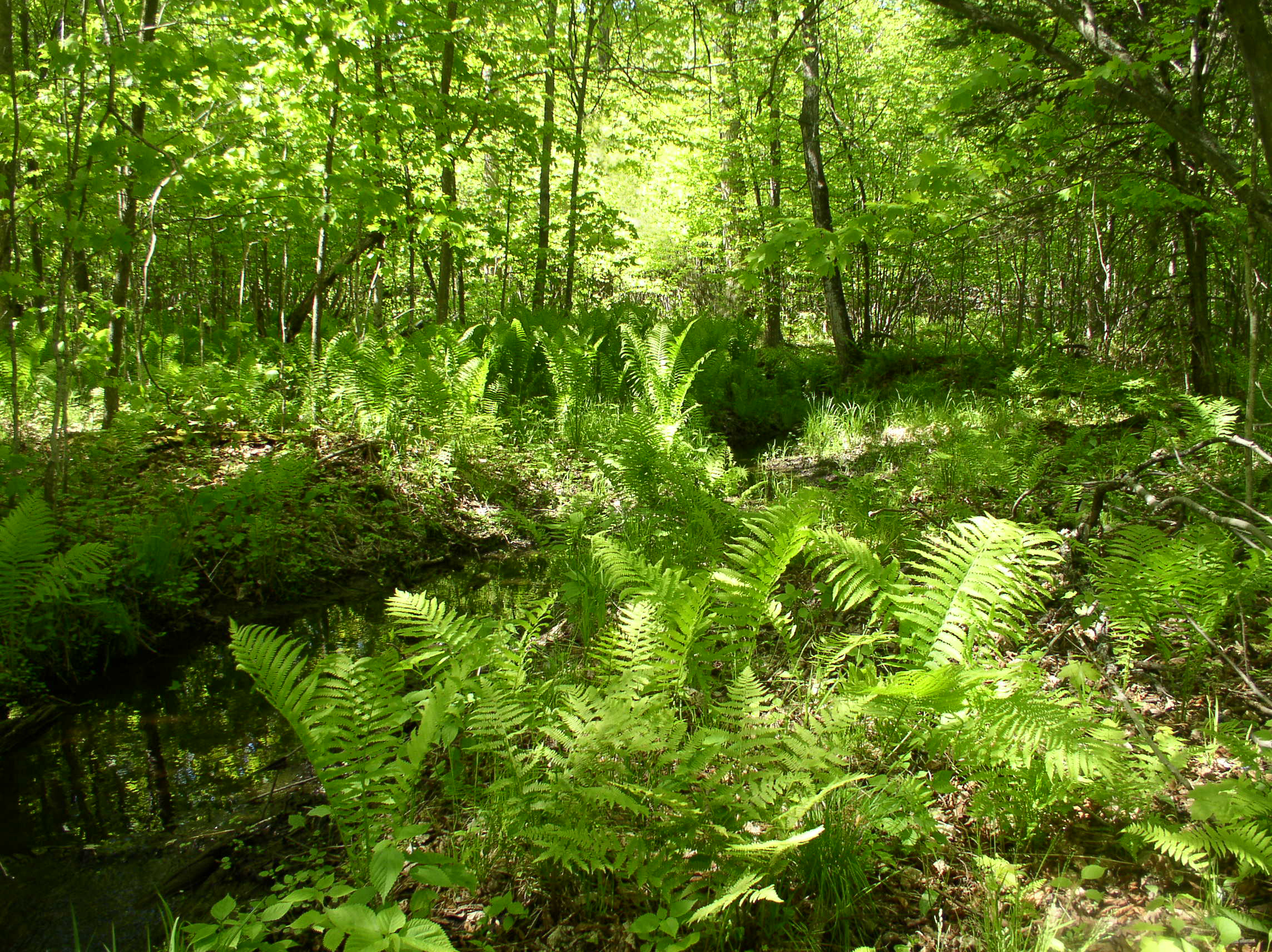
Scotch Corners Wetland has many seepage valleys and springs that support small streams draining into Mississippi Lake.

Scotch Corners Wetland is a provincially significant wetland complex located in Lanark County, Ontario, Canada. The 202 hectares (500 acres) area has a wide array of wetland types including swamps, marshes, vernal pools, beaver ponds and seepage areas. It forms the headwaters of several creeks that drain into Mississippi Lake.

== Description ==
The northern portions of the wetland are interspersed with forested gneiss ridges, while the southern and eastern portions are flat and underlain by clay sediments deposited by the post-glacial Champlain Sea. The old shoreline of the Champlain Sea meanders from Blue Heron Road in the north-east to Innisville in the south-west. The approximate contour for this shoreline is 150 to 155 metres (492 to 509 ft). Along this elevation, the clay deposits of the Champlain Sea abut exposed gneiss. A series of seepage areas, springs and small streams are scattered along this contact line.

Noteworthy breeding birds include osprey, great blue herons and turkey vultures. The larger ponds provide migratory resting areas for ducks, particularly wood ducks, hooded mergansers and ring-necked ducks. There are healthy populations of at least eight species of frogs: wood frogs, leopard frogs, spring peepers, American toads, gray treefrogs, mink frogs, green frogs and bullfrogs. There are also three species of salamanders: spotted, blue-spotted and red-backed. Three species of turtles are known from the wetland: painted turtles, snapping turtles and Blanding's turtles. Wetland mammals include otters, muskrats, beavers and ermine.

There is a typical wetland flora. Some significant plant species include a population of green arrow arum growing at the extreme northern limit of its range in North America, and a population of an uncommon orchid, downy rattlesnake plantain.

Only 57 hectares (140 acres) of the wetland and another 156 hectares (390 acres) of adjoining forest is protected by the Mississippi Madawaska Land Trust as the Keddy Nature Sanctuary.
