= Vankleek Hill Collegiate Institute =

Location
- 5814 Hwy #34; Vankleek Hill, Ontario, K0B 1R0; Canada; 45.5223°N 74.6516°W

Information
- School type: Public
- Founded: 1890
- School board: Upper Canada District School Board
- School number: 949094
- Principal: Christie Walker
- Grades: 9-12
- Language: English (with French Classes)
- Colours: Red and white
- Team name: Warriors & Rebels

Vankleek Hill Collegiate Institute (also called VCI by students and staff) is a small, English high school operated by the Upper Canada District School Board (UCDSB) in the heart Town of Vankleek Hill, Ontario, Canada. It provides both academic and vocational programs to about 450 students (2008–09).

VCI also publishes an annual Yearbook consisting of the full school year in pictures.

== Facilities ==
Their gymnasium is often used for athletic events, both extracurricular and intramural. It is also used for various special activities, such as school dances. Their cafeteria is catered by Glen Fine Foods. The school's library includes a limited collection of books and multiple internet-enabled computers. VCI is equipped with two regulation tennis courts. The residents from Vankleek Hill are always welcome in using the courts. The cafeteria now houses a stage where performances such as dances, talent shows and school plays are put on.

== Annual Green Day ==
Green Day has become a school-wide tradition at VCI. For more than 8 years, VCI students and staff help senior citizens in the Vankleek Hill community. They rake leaves and clean up lawns to make room for new spring growth.

== Notable alumni ==
- Dan McGillis - Retired NHL Hockey Player (Detroit Red Wings, Edmonton Oilers, Boston Bruins, San Jose Sharks, New Jersey Devils) as well as Adler Mannheim of the German DEL
- Martin St-Louis - NHL Hockey Player (Tampa Bay Lightning, Calgary Flames), Art Ross Trophy Winner, Hart Trophy Winner

== See also ==
- Education in Ontario
- List of secondary schools in Ontario
