= Ontario Woodlot Association =

Non-profit organization based in Kemptville, Ontario

- Founded: 1992
- Type: Forestry organization
- Purpose: Forestry
- Location: Kemptville, Ontario
- Region served: Ontario
- Members: 2800+
- Key people: John Pineau, Executive Director
- Website: www.ontariowoodlot.com

The Ontario Woodlot Association is a non-profit organization based in Kemptville, Ontario to support woodlot owners with sustainable woodlot management practices. The OWA and its chapters also engage in provincial and municipal governance, both through advocacy on behalf of their membership and contributions to government publications.

As of 2020 the OWA has 22 local chapters, primarily located in Southern Ontario but ranging from Algoma and North Bay in the north to Stormont, Dundas and Glengarry in the east, and Lake Erie in the south. While privately owned woodlots exist throughout the province, the vast majority of woodlands in the southern part of the province are privately owned, totalling over 4,000,000 ha.

Forest management is of particular importance in Southern Ontario, because forests in this part of the province are part of the important Mixedwood Plains Ecozone, which covers only 1.3% of Canada's land area; the rest of the province is covered by the Boreal Shield. Land development, led by the growth of the Golden Horseshoe, has had a major negative impact on forests in Southern Ontario.

== History ==
The OWA was founded in 1992 as the Ontario Woodlot and Sawmill Operators Association (OWSOA). At the time, the Ontario government was proposing changes to legislation including the Trees Act and wetland policy. The Managed Forest Tax Rebate Program (MFTRP) was also cancelled, which led to increased property taxes on private woodlots. Woodlot owners felt that these changes would diminish their ability to sustainably manage woodlots, leading to the formation of the OWSOA as a grassroots advocacy organization. In 1996, the province established the Managed Forest Tax Incentive Program due in part to OWSOA's lobbying. The organization adopted the name Ontario Woodlot Association around 1997.

== Projects ==
The OWA publishes a quarterly newsletter, “The Ontario Woodlander” (formerly the S & W Report) and a monthly eLetter to all members and supporters. The organization also offers workshops and courses on best practices in forest management. The OWA operates a Forest Services Directory and a Woodlot Marketplace as well as producing a number of publications. In addition to its activity in Ontario, the OWA is an active member of the Canadian Federation of Woodlot Owners.

After the ice storm of 1998 left forests in Eastern Ontario devastated, the OWA worked on behalf of landowners to get assistance with cleanup and restoration. The OWA joined with several governmental and non-governmental stakeholders to form the Ice Storm Forest Recovery Group. The work of this group included the Forest Recovery Assistance Program, which provided financial assistance to approximately 1000 woodlot owners to assist with assessment and clean-up.

The OWA was commissioned by Environment and Climate Change Canada to produce a report on firewood production in Southern Ontario. Firewood is an important source of fuel for heating, as approximately 7% of homes use firewood for heating, the third most prominent fuel source. The study also found that ash and beech are prominent sources of firewood due to the prevalence of emerald ash borer and Beech bark disease in provincial woodlots.
