= North Grenville District High School =

Secondary school in Kemptville, Ontario, Canada

Coordinates: 45.0088°N 75.6477°W

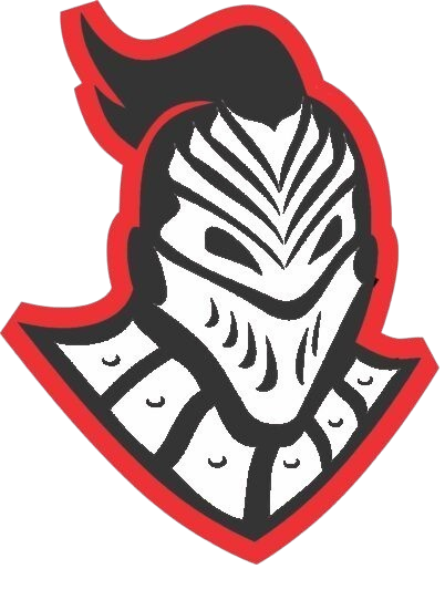

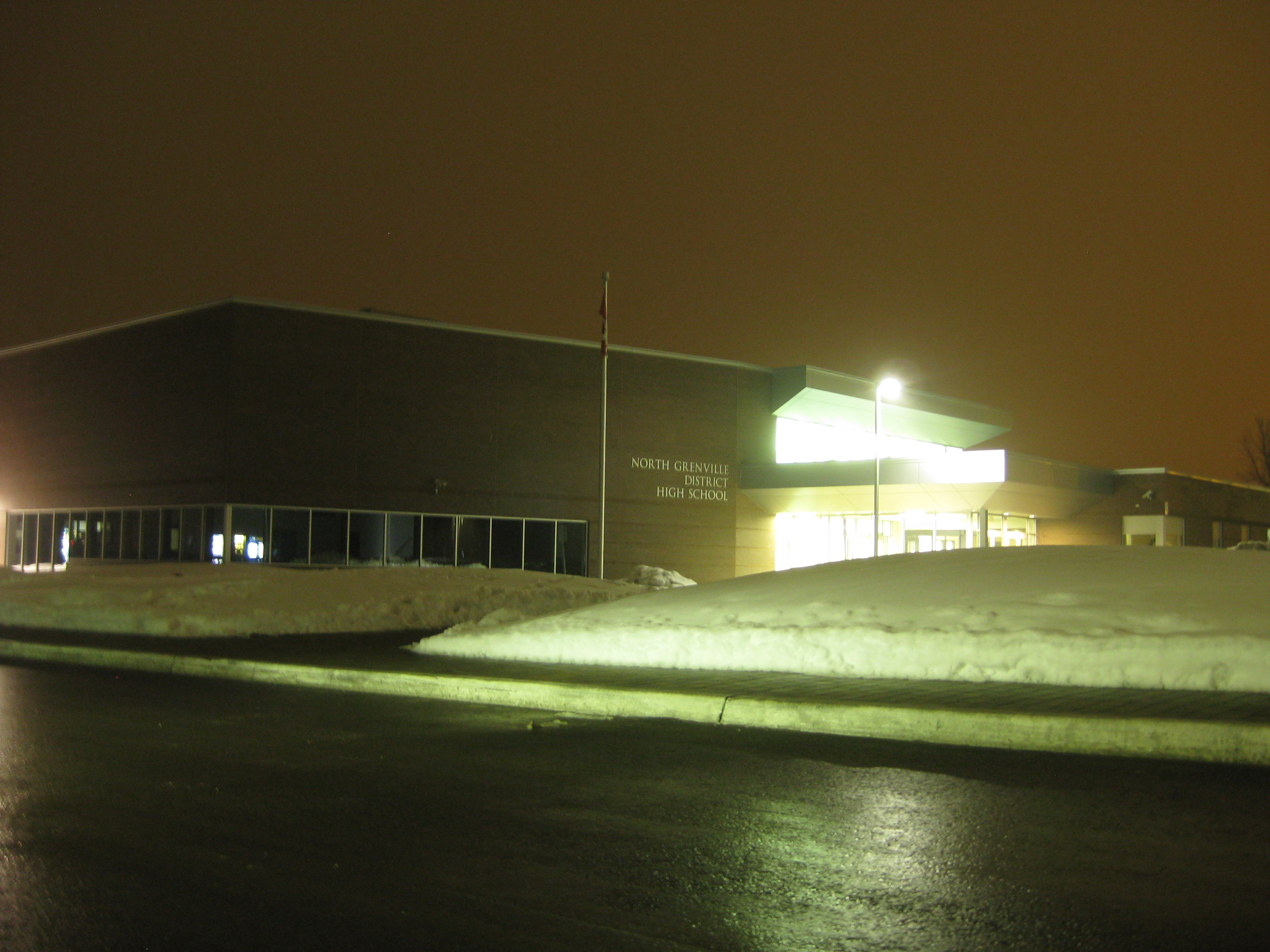
- North Grenville District High School, 2013

Location
- 2605 Concession Road; Kemptville, Ontario K0G 1J0; Canada

Information
- School type: Secondary
- Motto: Scientia Est Lux Itineris (Knowledge Is The Light Of The Journey)
- Established: 1936
- School board: Upper Canada District School Board
- Area trustee: Lisa Swan
- School number: 929859
- Principal: Kris Wiley
- Grades: 7-12
- Enrollment: 1000+
- Team name: Knights
- Yearbook: Norgrendi
- Student Council: Student Activity Council
- Website: https://northgrenville.ucdsb.on.ca

North Grenville District High School (NGDHS) is a secondary school in the community of Kemptville, Ontario. It is part of the Upper Canada District School Board and is currently at 2605 Concession Road, Kemptville, ON, K0G 1J0. Prior to 2012, North Grenville District High School was located at 304 Prescott Street, Kemptville, Ontario, K0G 1J0.

== History ==
In 1936, North Grenville District High School opened after replacing an older building that was destroyed by a fire. In 2012, the school was closed and students were moved to its current building in a different location. In 2018, the former building for the school was put up for sale. In 2019, it was purchased by a developer who had plans to convert it into a mixed residential and commercial property, even though the zoning for the property had not yet been changed. The local municipality did not realize that there was a zoning incompatibility until after a local business had relocated and stocked inventory on the property, but changed the zoning after a council meeting. According to Paulina Hrebacka, a journalist for the Toronto Star:

The redevelopment of the former North Grenville District High School, a main street centrepiece at 304 Prescott St. in downtown Kemptville, is something the community has long awaited. The nostalgia for high school alumni, heritage value and sentimental role the property has played as the site of North Grenville’s annual Remembrance Day celebrations all contribute to the building’s rich significance.

In 2011, North Grenville District High School introduced the Link Crew program, becoming the first school in the Upper Canada District School Board to implement the program. Since then, other schools in the school board have followed suit and introduced their own versions of the program.

In 2012, the new building for the relocated school was opened. Construction was completed at a cost of $17.3 million in 2014. In 2020, the secondary school received approval for funding from the Ministry of Education for a 23,357 square foot addition. According to the Chair of the Upper Canada District School Board, John McAllister, greater student population was expected due to population growth in Kemptville.

In 2022, the school's administration decided to opt out of being involved with prom; with no fundraising or support from staff for a sanctioned or non-sanctioned event. The Upper Canada District School Board sent a memo to schools within its district ahead of the prom season which mentioned that individual schools had the option of opting in or out of prom, even before the COVID-19 pandemic. As an alternative to not having a prom, grade 12 students and their families organized and funded the event themselves.

== Athletics ==
North Grenville District High School offers a variety of sports, and uses the team name, "Knights". The school's gymnasium is also used by the Kemptville College campus of the University of Guelph for certain events.

In 2022, the school competed in the OFSAA championship for badminton. That same year, the junior boys volleyball team competed in the regional playoffs and finished in second place.

== See also ==
- Education in Ontario
- List of secondary schools in Ontario
