= Carleton Place High School =

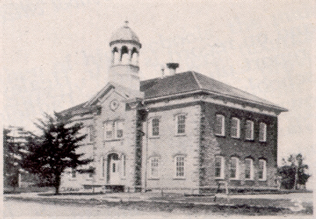
- A photograph of the school from 1924

Location
- 215 Lake Avenue West; Carleton Place, Ontario, K7C 1M3; Canada; 45.13336°N 76.14870°W

Information
- School type: Public high school
- Motto: Enter to learn, go forth to serve
- Founded: January 3, 1922
- School board: Upper Canada District School Board
- Principal: Don Hickey (Sep 2024)
- Grades: 7-12
- Enrollment: 950 (September 2018)
- Language: English and various types of french (immersion, core, etc.)
- Campus: Suburban, waterfront
- Area: Carleton Place and the surrounding Lanark County area
- Colours: Garnet and Gold
- Mascot: Brutus the Bear and Junior
- Team name: Bears
- Feeder schools: Arklan Public School, Beckwith Public School, Caldwell Street Public School.
- Website: carletonplace.ucdsb.on.ca

Carleton Place High School is a high school serving the town of Carleton Place, in Eastern Ontario, Canada. It is a member of the Upper Canada District School Board, and draws pupils from Carleton Place and the surrounding Lanark County area.

There is increasing diversity in Carleton Place High School as the result of an expanded international student base. In recent years CPHS has hosted students from China, Japan, Italy, Brazil, Switzerland, and South Korea.

== History ==
The cornerstone of the present High School (Prince of Wales High School) was laid in 1923 and under it was placed a scroll containing the following information: The High School has made many moves since it was started, about 1848, as a Grammar School. The first building used was a frame one on the Central School grounds.

From there it was moved to Hurd's Hall on Bell Street, being the upper flat of the building for many years known as McKay's Bakery. After that the present Holiness Church on the corner of Bridge and Herriott Streets, was used for a short time. Then the north-east room in the present Central School was used.

From here it was moved to Newman's Hall, in the rooms now occupied as temporary quarters for a High and a Public School class. This school went back again to the Central School building for a short time, until the present used building on High Street was ready for occupation in 1882.Note: Newman's Hall is the building now occupied by the Brewers' Retail Store and the school on High Street is the present Prince of Wales School.

For nearly 30 years the people of Carleton Place were considering the question of better school accommodation, but owing to the exigencies of the times, such as loss of population, removal of industries and expenditures on other public undertakings, small progress was made.

Early in 1922 it was decided to build a high school. Messrs. Richards & Abra of Ottawa were selected as architects, a plan was adopted, the estimated cost being placed at $100,000. A building committee was appointed composed of J. M. Brown, chairman, A. E. Cram, Alfred McNeely and W. J. Muirhead.

On June 12, 1922, the Council submitted the question to the electorate who pronounced in favor of granting the aforesaid sum by a vote of 412 for to 79 against. The scroll concluded with a list of the contractors.

On January 3, 1924, the present high school was opened.

The Canadian's files recount some of the turbulence that accompanied building of schools, including a riot which once decided the place for the town hall.

Howard M. Brown records that in the 1870s came municipal incorporation, the building of a town hall on Edmund Street (now Victoria School) and finally the provision of a high school on High Street.

The school was built in 1877 by the Board of Education. The succeeding administration, supporting objections to its location refused to accept the school and in 1879 began converting the town hall into classrooms. After public and private litigation, the high school was occupied as such.

The town hall settled into service as a combination Public School and village lock-up. Which currently houses The Victoria School Museum.

The school has a club and extracurricular activity roster for students including several bands; sports - most notability girls hockey, coed baseball and football, boys/girls basketball, volleyball and track; and a Reach For The Top trivia team.

== See also ==
- Education in Ontario
- List of secondary schools in Ontario
