= Thousand Islands Secondary School =

Location
- 2510 Parkedale Ave. Brockville, Ontario, K6V 3H1; Canada; 44.60242°N 75.70432°W

Information
- School type: Public high school
- Established: 1965
- School board: Upper Canada District School Board
- Principal: Laura Oliver
- Vice principal: Mark Wiltsie
- Vice principal: Nancy Keech
- Grades: 7 to 12
- Enrollment: 1500 approx (2023)
- Language: English
- Area: Brockville
- Colour: Purple
- Mascot: Pirate Stanley
- Team name: The Pirates
- Website: tiss.ucdsb.on.ca

Thousand Islands Secondary School (TISS) is a public high school in the city of Brockville, Ontario and one of the most populous high school managed by the Upper Canada District School Board. Built in 1965, the school has been a part of the Brockville community for over 50 years

TISS has an enrollment of approximately 1500 students and offers a wide range of programs. The school offers a full complement of academic, technical and arts courses in addition to skilled trades programs and many Specialist High Skills Major (SHSM) programs. The school also has many other unique programs such as Integrated Math/Science and Technology (MST), an online education program, co-operative education and the International Studies Program which allows students each year to travel to locations such as Nicaragua, Germany, Greece, and Italy.

== Athletics ==
The school has captured 110+ EOSSAA championships and many OFSAA championship banners. Several past TISS Pirates have represented Canada in track and field, basketball, football, and cross country.

TISS held the 2012 OFSAA track and field event at their facility.

=== Track and field/cross country ===
The track and field/cross country program at the school is one of the most known facets of Brockville and is known across Canada. The team has won 11 OFSAA team titles since 2002, captured over 50 individual OFSAA medals, and seen over 20 of their athletes to NCAA schools on full athletic scholarships. In 2004 the school sent a record setting 6 track stars to the U.S. on NCAA track scholarships. The scholarships totaled over $275,000 (USD) combined. It saw the athletes to schools in New York, Tennessee, Louisiana, and North Carolina. To this day no other school in Ontario has produced more scholarships in one year than the Pirates. Thousand Islands Secondary School hosted the OFSAA track and field meet in June 2012, it is one of the biggest track and field meets in North America.

=== Girls basketball ===
The girls basketball program has captured three OFSAA championships, and has won the EOSSAA title 7 of the past 12 years. Stacey Dales (WNBA, Canadian Women's Olympic Basketball Team), and Kendra Walker-Roche (Fresno State, NCAA) are just 2 of the many post-secondary players who developed their skills at TISS. . The football and soccer programs have also achieved great success with several alumni suiting up for professional teams (Burke Dales of the Pittsburgh Steelers and Calgary Stampeders and Troy Cunningham of the B.C. Lions) and has created a reputation throughout Ontario and Canada as one of the best high school sports programs.

The school finished construction of a $1,500,000 track and field and athletic complex with funding from the Friends of TISS Committee. Many prominent Brockville families contributed to the project.

== See also ==
- Education in Ontario
- List of secondary schools in Ontario
