= Dan Wicklum =

Canadian politician (born 1965)

Daniel Daly Wicklum
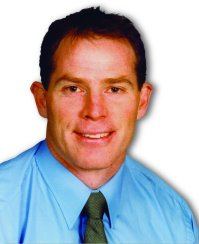
- Wicklum in 2004

No. 35
- Position: Linebacker

Personal information
- Born: February 28, 1965 (age 61); Edmonton, Alberta, Canada

Career information
- College: Guelph
- CFL draft: 1988: 1st round

Career history
- 1988: Winnipeg Blue Bombers
- 1989–1991: Calgary Stampeders

Awards and highlights
- 1984 Vanier Cup (CIAU) winner; 1987 OUAA All-Star; 1988 Winnipeg's Rookie of the Year; 1988 Grey Cup winner; 1989 & 1990 Calgary's Special Teams Player of the Year; Guelph Gryphons record most total tackles in a season (1987: 119)

Dan Wicklum (born February 28, 1965) is a Canadian businessman and former football player. He is currently CEO of The Transition Accelerator. He was CEO of Canada's Oil Sands Innovation Alliance for seven years, was executive director of the Canadian Forest Innovation Council, and has been a senior manager at Environment and Climate Change Canada and Natural Resources Canada.

His initial career was football, as a linebacker for the Calgary Stampeders and the Winnipeg Blue Bombers in the Canadian Football League (CFL).

Wicklum has a PhD from the University of Montana, an MSc. From the University of Calgary and a BSc. from the University of Guelph.

== Early life ==
Wicklum was raised in Perth, Ontario, in the Ottawa Valley, and attended St. John's Separate School and Perth and District Collegiate Institute. He played football with the Ottawa Sooners of the Canadian Junior Football League. After high school graduation, he entered the University of Guelph and received a B.S. in biology in 1990. He played football with the Guelph Gryphons winning the Vanier Cup in 1984 and named an OUAA All-Star in 1987, setting the Guelph record with 119 total tackles in the season. In 2002, Wicklum was named to the Guelph's Athletics hall of fame.

== Professional football career ==
The CFL's Winnipeg Blue Bombers drafted him in the first round of the 1988 Canadian College Draft. Securing a starting linebacker role, Wicklum went on to help the team win the Grey Cup in 1988. In 1989, the Calgary Stampeders selected him as the first Canadian player in an equalization draft. He then played three seasons for the Stampeders and named Calgary's special teams Player of the Year twice.

== Post-football career ==
After retiring from football, Wicklum went on with his education in the field of aquatic ecology, completing an M.S. in 1994 at the University of Calgary, and a Ph.D. in 1998 at the University of Montana. In Montana, he also did postdoctoral work, served as research assistant professor, and authored nine scholarly papers. While there, he and his wife, Dr. Sonja Wicklum, had their children named Connor and Ali.

Wicklum launched and was later named executive director of the Canadian Forest Innovation Council and then occupied various senior positions for Environment Canada and Natural Resources Canada including Director of Strategic Alliances, Director General of Wildlife and Landscape Science, and Director General of Water Science and Technology.

Dan was the Chief Executive of COSIA (Canada’s Oil Sands Innovation Alliance) from March 2012 to February 2019.

In August 2019, he became the first CEO of The Transition Accelerator.
