= Kemptville =

Community in North Grenville, Ontario

- Unincorporated community
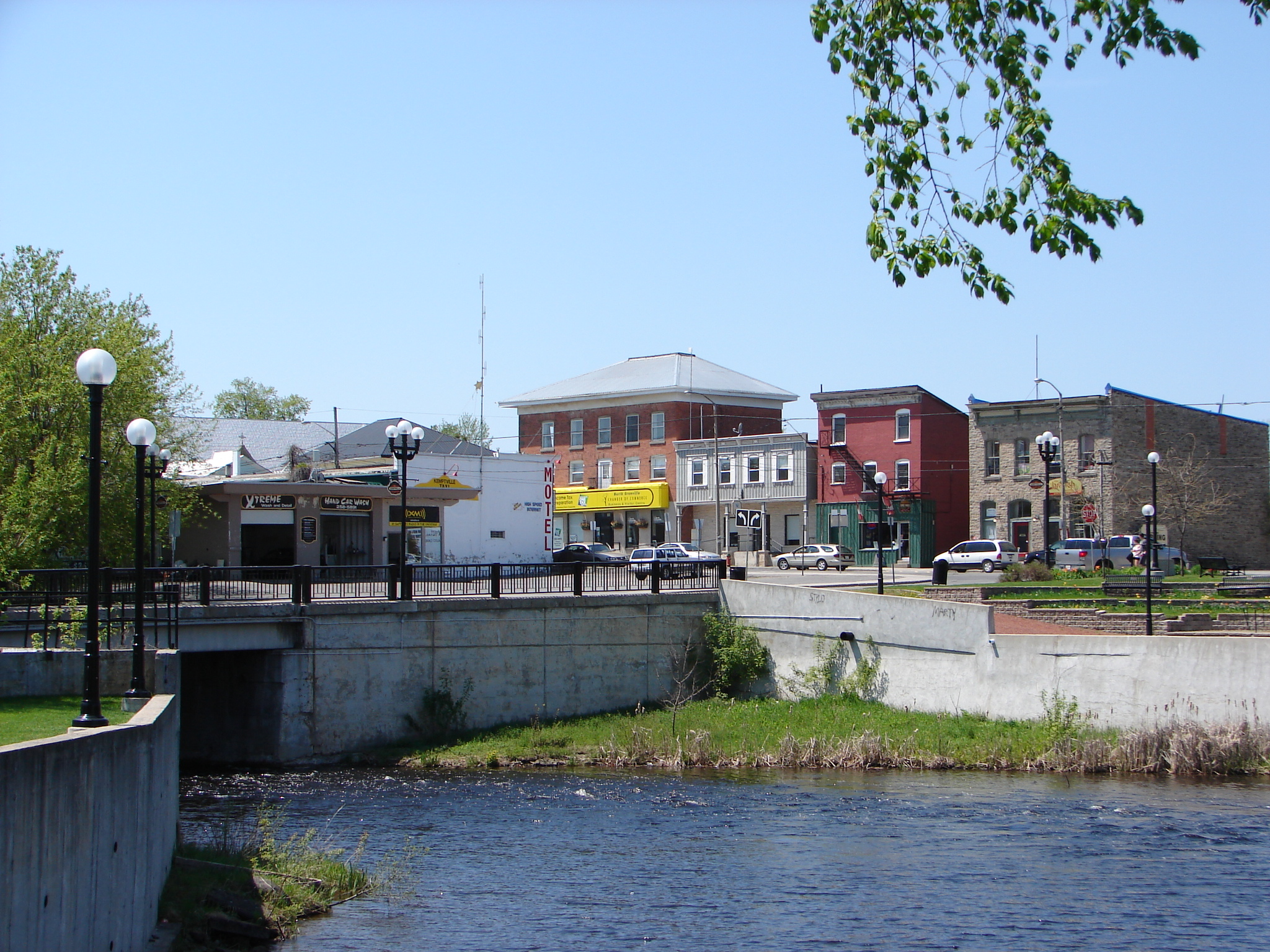
- Kemptville and the Kemptville Creek

- Location in Ontario Kemptville (Canada)
- Coordinates: 45°01′N 75°39′W
- Country: Canada
- Province: Ontario
- County: Leeds and Grenville United Counties
- Municipality: North Grenville

Government
  - Type: Township
  - Federal riding: Leeds—Grenville—Thousand Islands—Rideau Lakes
  - Prov. riding: Leeds—Grenville

Area
  - Land: 3.21 km^{2} (1.24 sq mi)

Population (2016)
  - Total: 3,911
  - Density: 1,099.5/km^{2} (2,848/sq mi)
- Time zone: UTC−05:00 (EST)
  - Summer (DST): UTC−04:00 (EDT)
- Postal code FSA: K0G
- Area codes: 613, 343

Kemptville is a community located in the Municipality of North Grenville in Eastern Ontario, Canada in the northernmost part of the United Counties of Leeds and Grenville. It is located approximately 56 km (35 mi) south of the downtown core of Ottawa and 2.5 to 3 km (1.6 to 1.9 mi) south of the Rideau River.

The community can be accessed by Highway 416, also known as the Veterans Memorial Highway, which was completed in 1999, and from Leeds and Grenville Road 43 (formerly Highway 43).

Kemptville is the largest community in North Grenville, with about 69% of North Grenville's population. Five elementary schools are located in the town — Holy Cross Catholic School, Kemptville Public School, South Branch Elementary School, Académie Catholique Notre Dame and Rivière Rideau— two high schools — North Grenville District High School and St. Michael Catholic High School — three parks, and two hotels. The residential area is generally located in the south and east parts of the community. The main streets are Rideau, Prescott, Clothier and Van Buren streets. A creek named Kemptville Creek divides Kemptville in the southeast, where the least part of Kemptville is found. The creek begins southwest of Kemptville and empties 4 km (2.5 mi) NE into the Rideau River. Much of Kemptville is forested, especially east and north of the community. Farmland covers the rest of the area, especially the west and the southern part of the community, with some exceptions. There are some homes lying next to the farmland.

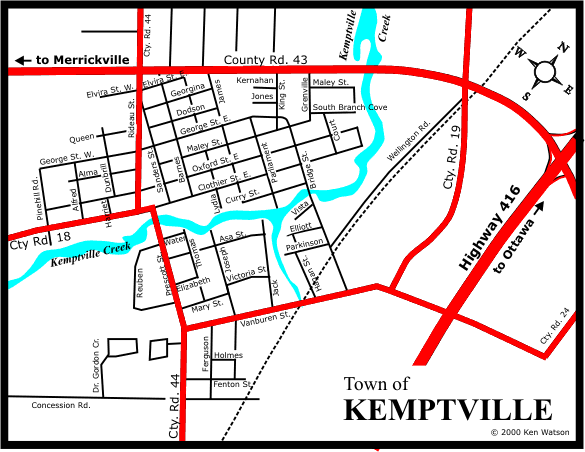
Map of the town of Kemptville

== History ==
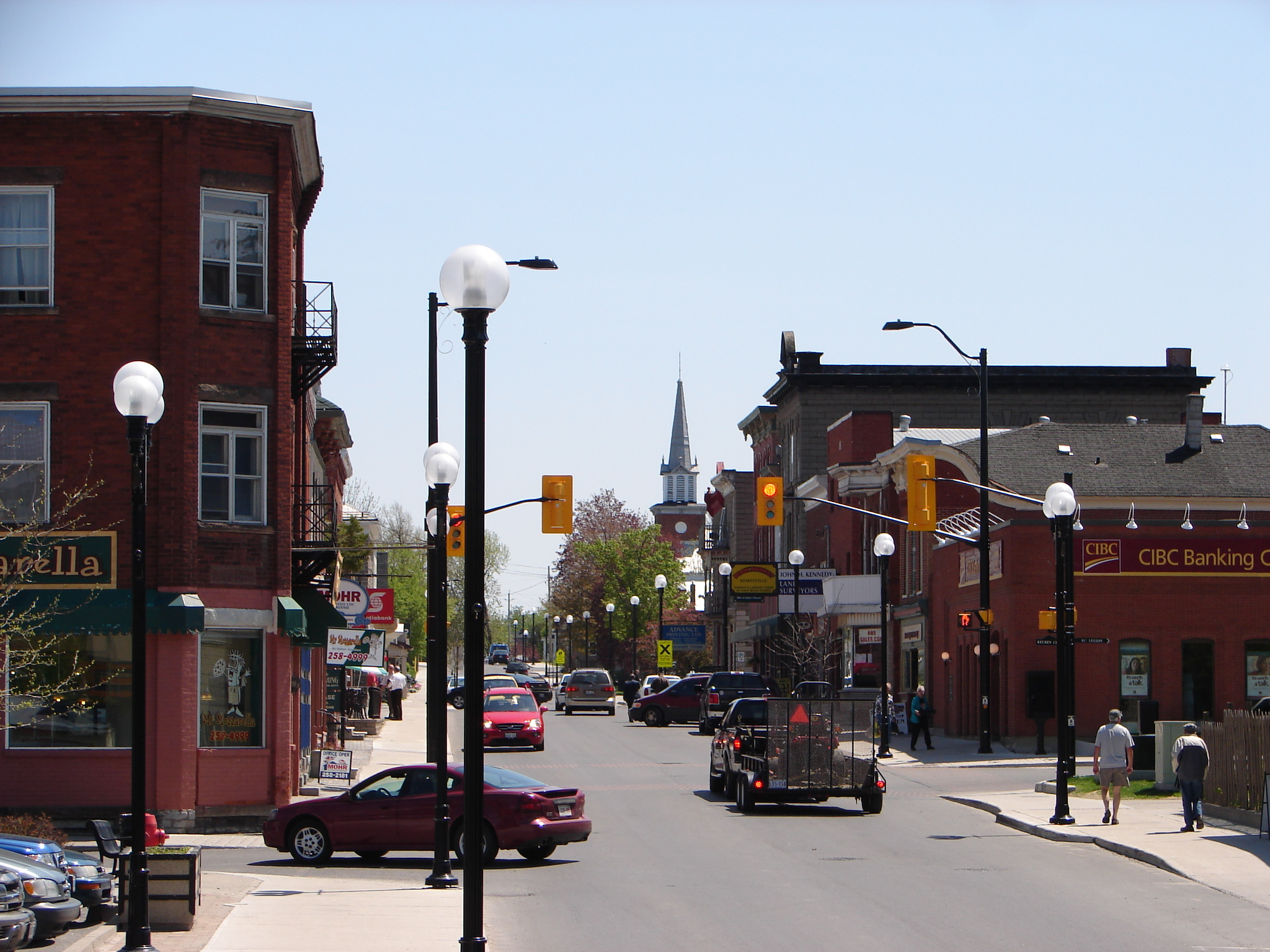
Kemptville's Prescott Street

The small town of Kemptville began to emerge from the forest in the township of Oxford when Lyman Clothier, a resident of New England, bought 100 acres (40 ha) of land in Concession 3 of Oxford-on-Rideau Township from a John Byce in 1819 for C£75. Mr. Clothier began construction of a saw mill with the assistance of his four sons, and they built two dwellings in what is now Kemptville. This mill was extremely important for the settling of the community, as in order to construct a crude dwelling, lumber was required - and so, the mill began to facilitate the construction of dwellings for settlers all over Oxford Township.

The Clothiers placed some grinding stones in the lower part of their saw mill. As a result of this, rather than taking their grain to a site on the Saint Lawrence River, which would be a daunting hike in the best of conditions, or grinding the grain in an extremely ineffective and crude fashion, the settlers could now take it to this grist mill. After this was established, a blacksmith's shop was established, run also by the Clothiers. A schoolhouse was established in 1823, which served the surrounding communities for many years. The first physician arrived in the community the year after the school was established.

The small village was expanding quickly and the residents of the region were beginning to think about officially giving a dignified name to the location in which they lived. Initially, the community was known as "Clothier's Mill". So, during a public meeting at this time, the name "Kemptville" was suggested, to honour Sir James Kempt, the Governor of Upper Canada in 1829, who was said to have camped on the banks of the Rideau River near the settlement. The name was adopted in 1829 and the first map with the name "Kemptville" was produced in 1830. The post office was established in 1831.

=== Timeline ===
- 1791 - Oxford-On-Rideau surveyed
- 1819 - Lyman Clothier buys 100 acres on lot 27, Concession 3 of Oxford-on-Rideau Township
- 1820s - Clothier family open sawmill, blacksmiths shop, and carding machine for weaving
- 1820 - First hotel opened
- 1821 - First mill is opened. First store and post office follow shortly thereafter
- 1826 - St. James Anglican church parish is formed
- 1829 - "Kemptville" is formally acknowledged as the town's name; Holy Cross Parish is established
- 1832 - Methodist Church is erected and another hotel opens
- 1838 - Another carding machine and saw mill open
- 1843 - First steamboat is built in Kemptville by Lyman Clothier Jr.; the Amanda named after his daughter.
- 1844 - The first grammar school is built on Clothier Street
- 1847 - Baptist Church is built on the North Main Street
- 1848 - Another mill is built which also acted as a distillery for a time
- 1851-52 - Population of Upper Canada: 952,004
- 1851 - The first Presbyterian Church is built; first stamp the Threepenny Beaver is released in Canada
- 1854 - The Bytown and Prescott Railway comes to Kemptville allowing for easier access to goods and trade
- 1855 - Kemptville Fire Department is formed; Kemptville's first paper The Progressionis hits the streets
- 1857 - Kemptville becomes incorporated
- 1861 - Population of Kemptville is 1059
- 1869 - Sellecks Mill is built as an egg factory; the New Methodist Church is built
- 1870 - First library is formed
- 1872 - The Great Fire which destroys most of downtown Kemptville
- 1874 - The Kemptville Academy is built as the central school; the town hall is built; a hose tower is built to help combat fire in town
- 1879 - Memorial Church of Kemptville is built
- 1881 - First steam engine is purchased for the Fire Department
- 1885 - Bakery is built on 115 Clothier Street East
- 1888 - Holy Cross Church designed by Joseph Connolly is built; the district High School is built; The Salvation Army comes to Kemptville; electricity comes to Kemptville via a mill which lights the Oddfellows hall for a fair
- 1895 - Bank of Ottawa opens (later becoming the Bank of Nova Scotia)
- 1899 - The Horticultural Society is formed in Kemptville
- 1845-1900 - The rise of the service clubs
- 1910 - A fire destroys part of Asa Street
- 1936 - North Grenville District High School opens on Prescott Street
- 1999 - St. Michael Catholic High School opens on County Road 43
- 2012 - North Grenville District High School opens on Concession Road
- 2017 - Kemptville celebrates its 160th Anniversary
- 2018 - North Grenville elects its first female mayor

== Climate ==
Climate data for Kemptville (1991−2020 normals, extremes 1928–present)
| Month | Jan | Feb | Mar | Apr | May | Jun | Jul | Aug | Sep | Oct | Nov | Dec | Year |
|---|---|---|---|---|---|---|---|---|---|---|---|---|---|
| Record high °C (°F) | 15.5 (59.9) | 16.1 (61.0) | 26.7 (80.1) | 30.3 (86.5) | 34.8 (94.6) | 38.3 (100.9) | 36.7 (98.1) | 38.3 (100.9) | 36.1 (97.0) | 28.3 (82.9) | 23.3 (73.9) | 17.8 (64.0) | 38.3 (100.9) |
| Mean daily maximum °C (°F) | −4.3 (24.3) | −2.4 (27.7) | 3.4 (38.1) | 11.4 (52.5) | 19.3 (66.7) | 24.3 (75.7) | 26.8 (80.2) | 25.6 (78.1) | 21.3 (70.3) | 13.6 (56.5) | 6.3 (43.3) | −0.9 (30.4) | 12.0 (53.6) |
| Daily mean °C (°F) | −9.1 (15.6) | −7.7 (18.1) | −1.8 (28.8) | 5.9 (42.6) | 13.1 (55.6) | 18.3 (64.9) | 20.8 (69.4) | 19.7 (67.5) | 15.4 (59.7) | 8.6 (47.5) | 2.0 (35.6) | −4.9 (23.2) | 6.7 (44.1) |
| Mean daily minimum °C (°F) | −14.0 (6.8) | −12.9 (8.8) | −7.0 (19.4) | 0.3 (32.5) | 6.9 (44.4) | 12.3 (54.1) | 14.8 (58.6) | 13.7 (56.7) | 9.4 (48.9) | 3.6 (38.5) | −2.3 (27.9) | −8.8 (16.2) | 1.3 (34.3) |
| Record low °C (°F) | −38.3 (−36.9) | −39.4 (−38.9) | −32.0 (−25.6) | −15.6 (3.9) | −6.7 (19.9) | −0.6 (30.9) | 3.0 (37.4) | −0.6 (30.9) | −6.5 (20.3) | −12.2 (10.0) | −23.9 (−11.0) | −35.6 (−32.1) | −39.4 (−38.9) |
| Average precipitation mm (inches) | 69.5 (2.74) | 52.2 (2.06) | 62.1 (2.44) | 87.7 (3.45) | 72.6 (2.86) | 82.2 (3.24) | 97.8 (3.85) | 75.0 (2.95) | 82.7 (3.26) | 92.4 (3.64) | 79.2 (3.12) | 71.8 (2.83) | 925.2 (36.43) |
| Average rainfall mm (inches) | 23.5 (0.93) | 22.6 (0.89) | 25.4 (1.00) | 70.5 (2.78) | 84.4 (3.32) | 79.9 (3.15) | 93.9 (3.70) | 87.5 (3.44) | 92.3 (3.63) | 78.5 (3.09) | 67.4 (2.65) | 30.9 (1.22) | 756.7 (29.79) |
| Average snowfall cm (inches) | 40.7 (16.0) | 40.6 (16.0) | 34.0 (13.4) | 12.2 (4.8) | 0.4 (0.2) | 0.0 (0.0) | 0.0 (0.0) | 0.0 (0.0) | 0.0 (0.0) | 4.4 (1.7) | 21.5 (8.5) | 45.1 (17.8) | 199.0 (78.3) |
| Average precipitation days (≥ 0.2 mm) | 17.6 | 13.3 | 12.4 | 13.8 | 12.9 | 12.6 | 13.7 | 11.3 | 12.7 | 14.1 | 14.7 | 16.0 | 164.9 |
| Average rainy days (≥ 0.2 mm) | 3.8 | 3.2 | 5.8 | 11.6 | 14.5 | 12.2 | 12.1 | 12.5 | 13.0 | 13.3 | 11.8 | 4.9 | 118.6 |
| Average snowy days (≥ 0.2 cm) | 13.8 | 10.2 | 7.1 | 3.1 | 0.12 | 0.0 | 0.0 | 0.0 | 0.0 | 0.76 | 5.1 | 11.6 | 51.7 |
| Average relative humidity (%) (at 15:00) | 68.0 | 61.8 | 56.2 | 51.2 | 52.1 | 56.1 | 54.9 | 56.7 | 57.8 | 63.2 | 67.2 | 75.0 | 60.0 |
| Mean monthly sunshine hours | 98.5 | 125.2 | 160.3 | 177.3 | 229.2 | 254.5 | 284.7 | 253.5 | 182.5 | 146.7 | 89.2 | 67.1 | 2,068.5 |
| Percentage possible sunshine | 34.5 | 42.7 | 43.5 | 43.9 | 49.9 | 54.6 | 60.3 | 58.1 | 48.4 | 43.0 | 31.0 | 24.5 | 44.5 |
Source: Environment Canada (rainfall/snow/sun 1981–2010)

== Sports ==
The Kemptville 73's are a Tier II Junior "A" hockey team and members of the Central Canada Hockey League. The team was founded as the Kemptville Comets of the Rideau-St. Lawrence Junior B Hockey League in 1969, but the league later became the Eastern Ontario Junior B Hockey League and the Comets became the 73's in 1973. The 73's were promoted to Junior "A" in the Summer of 2007. Also known for their young teams the Kemptville Royals and the Kemptville storm who play in The Upper Canada Minor Hockey League

Birthplace of 1930s NHL player Desse (Desmond) Roche.

== Media ==
=== Radio ===
The Kemptville area is served by a number of radio stations out of the Ottawa-Gatineau areas, including Brockville. Kemptville is served by one local radio station.

- CKVV-FM 97.5; Kemptville's first local FM radio station launched in 2012.

=== Newspapers ===
The North Grenville Times, a locally owned community newspaper, is delivered every Wednesday.

== Language ==
Out of Canada's official languages, 95% of the population is Anglophone and 17.4% is fluent in French.

== Notable people ==
- Charles P. Anderson (1865–1930), presiding bishop of the Episcopal Church, born in Kemptville
- W. B. George (1899–1972), president of the Canadian Amateur Hockey Association and lecturer at Kemptville Agricultural School
- Derek Holmes, IIHF Hall of Fame inductee, ice hockey coach and player agent
- Des Roche - NHL hockey player
- George Howard Ferguson (1870-1946), served as the 9th premier of Ontario between 1923-1930.
- Ryan Hreljac - activist and founder of the Ryan's Well Foundation.

== See also ==
- Kemptville College, University of Guelph
- Ontario Woodlot Association, organization based in Kemptville
