= Worldwide Youth in Science and Engineering =

The Worldwide Youth in Science and Engineering (WYSE) is a program run by the Grainger College of Engineering at the University of Illinois at Urbana-Champaign that offers STEM programs to pre-college students, including summer programs and mentorships, as well as the Academic Challenge, a high school academic competition run by Eastern Illinois University.

== Summer Programs ==
=== High School Summer Research ===
The High School Summer Research programs offers STEM research to rising high school juniors and seniors from the Champaign–Urbana metropolitan area. The programs are non-residential, last for 6 weeks, and take place at the University of Illinois at Urbana-Champaign, where students are able to research various STEM fields.

=== High School Summer Camps ===
About a dozen overnight engineering camps are offered to any rising high school students. There are various activities designed to expose students to different areas of engineering.

=== Middle School Summer Camps ===
Middle school summer camps are offered to rising 6th, 7th, 8th, and 9th grade students in the local area. It involves various activities to expose students to engineering and requires a limited enrollment merit-based application.

== STEM Mentorship ==
The WYSE STEM Mentorship is a collaboration between WYSE and its partner programs Catalyzing Inclusive Stem Experience All Year Round (CISTEME365), Chicago Pre-College Science & Engineering Program (Chi S&E), and Chicago Pre-College Science & Engineering Program (Chi S&E). It provides afterschool and weekend STEM programs to K-12 youth.

== WYSE LEADers ==
The WYSE LEADers program provides STEM education designed to develop leadership and communication skills to pre-college students.

== Academic Challenge ==
The Academic Challenge was founded by the University of Illinois at Urbana-Champaign and was run by it for about 40 years, but it is now run by Eastern Illinois University. The team competition consists teams of 6 to 14 people from multiple high schools, with each competitor taking two exams. Competitors are also allowed to enter as "At-Large" competitors, in which they enter as individuals not representing a school team. There are seven subject areas from which each student chooses their two tests: Biology, Chemistry, Computer Science, Engineering Graphics/Drafting, English, Mathematics, and Physics. Awards are given to both teams and individuals at three progressively harder levels; Regionals, Sectionals, and the State Finals.

=== Test format ===
The tests are 40 minute multiple choice tests. Each test has a different number of questions. Computer Science and Mathematics are 30 question exams; Physics 35; Biology 50; Chemistry and Engineering Graphics 40; and English 80. These questions are divided into subcategories in each field; for instance, there are 14 Algebra questions, 7 Geometry questions, etc. on the Mathematics exam at the Regional Level.

=== Scoring system ===
==== Individual ====
Tests are graded and ranked from highest score to lowest score based on the number of correct answers. At Regionals and Sectionals, the top 3 scores in each test, including ties, are awarded medals. At the State Finals, the top 6 scores including ties are awarded medals.

==== Team ====
Individual tests are graded and ranked from highest score to lowest score. The two highest scores in each subject for a school are added together to determine the school's Team Subject Raw Score for that subject. If a school has only one score in a subject, the Raw Score is zero.

Each Team Subject Raw Score is normalized by multiplying it by 100 and then dividing it by the greatest Team Subject Raw Score among all competing school teams.

Once the normalized scores have been found, the school's score is determined by adding the normalized scores for five of the seven tests together. The five tests are English, Chemistry, Mathematics, and the two highest normalized scores of the remaining four tests (Biology, Computer Science, Engineering Graphics, and Physics).

=== Advancement ===
Individuals and teams advance from Regionals to Sectionals to the State Finals based on their placement at the current level of competition.

==== Individual ====
Individuals who place 1st or 2nd, including ties, at either Regionals or Sectionals advance to the next level. Thus, if there is one 1st place individual and a four-way tie for 2nd, five individuals will advance to the next level for that subject.

At the Sectional level, individuals can also advance to the State Finals by scoring a pre-determined qualifying score on a test. This prevents Sectionals from advancing only the top two scores when there are additional high scores below the 2nd place finisher(s).

If an individual qualifies to advance for one test, that individual still takes two tests at the next level, even if their school does not advance with the individual.

==== Team ====
Teams advance to the next level based on their finish compared to the number of schools competing. If there are 1 or 2 teams competing, both advance. If there are from 3–7 teams, the top 2 advance. If there are from 8–12 teams, the top 3 advance. If there are from 13–16 teams, the top 4 advance. If there are more than 16 teams, the top 5 advance.
