= Athens District High School =

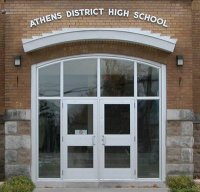

Location
- 21 Church St. Athens, Ontario, K0E 1B0; Canada; 44°37′30.08″N 75°56′50.66″W

Information
- School type: Public High school
- Founded: 1876
- School board: Upper Canada District School Board
- School number: 892807
- Administrator: Karen Earl
- Principal: Brent Brown
- Grades: 7 to 12
- Enrollment: 199 (2023)
- Language: English
- Area: Athens
- Colours: Blue and Gold
- Mascot: Willy the Warrior
- Team name: Warriors
- Website: athens.ucdsb.on.ca

Athens District High School or A.D.H.S is a high school under the Upper Canada District School Board. The school is in the small town of Athens, Ontario, Canada. Its website lists many achievements, including winning awards and media competitions, pioneering new systems of education and taking part in extracurricular courses and international student exchanges. The high school has more than 200 students enrolled as of 2024.

The school has a student parliament system in which it takes great pride and encourages students to be involved every year. The parliament consists of two parties, blue and gold. The school's website contains its constitution. The school was recognized in 2008 for its parliament system in an article in Maclean's magazine which said, "Since 1947, the school has held monthly parliamentary sessions (except during the COVID-19 pandemic) replete with parties and question periods. It is only an hour from Athens to Ottawa, but Athens high-schoolers don't have to go to the capital to understand our political system." In 2022, they celebrated their 75th year of the parliament tradition. In 2026, a new tricorne hat was presented to the student parliament by member of Provincial Parliament Steve Clark. The tricorne hat is a key symbol of the Speaker's role and importance, and an important part of the school's tradition.

The front of Athens District High School has a mural of the 1921 original school that burned, as well as students from the time period. The eyes and car in the mural seem to follow you when you walk by.

Despite being a small school, it has provided its students with many opportunities to travel all over the world. In 2008, "ADHS visited Europe (France, Belgium, The Netherlands), New York, and British Columbia." The school has many clubs for students, such as work crew, global virtual classroom, formal, world issues, environmental, tech, chess, mathematics, and yearbook.

In 2026, in collaboration with Brockville Collegiate Institute's Collected History Project,

Christopher Perkins, the gold medal winner in the longbow category at the 2011 World Archery Championships in Turin, Italy, is a former student.

== See also ==
- Education in Ontario
- List of secondary schools in Ontario
