= Mississippi Lake =

Lake in Eastern Ontario

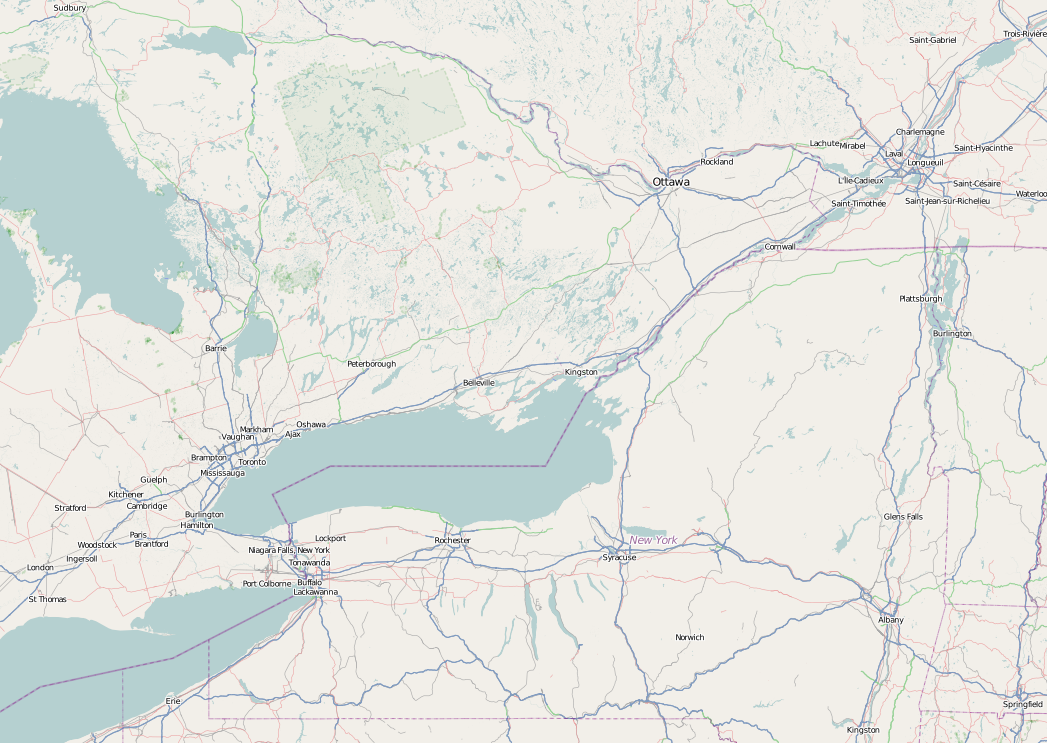
- Location within Ontario-Quebec
- Location: Lanark County, Ontario
- Coordinates: 45°04′01″N 76°09′56″W
- Primary inflows: Mississippi River
- Primary outflows: Mississippi River
- Basin countries: Canada
- Max. length: 16 km (9.9 miles)
- Max. depth: 10 m (33 ft)
- Shore length^{1}: 55.9 km (34.7 mi)
- Surface elevation: 134 m (440 ft)
- Islands: Loon Island, Greig Island, Burnt Island, Pine Island, Wilson islands, The Two Crabs, Willis Island, Long View Island, Morris Island, Dinkey-Dooley Island (real name) and Aberdeen Island
- ^{1} Shore length is not a well-defined measure.

Mississippi Lake is a lake in Lanark County in Ontario, Canada, about 60 km southwest of Ottawa. It is a shallow and narrow lake, about 10 m deep at its deepest, 16 km in length, and less than one km wide in most places. Around the shoreline are over 1,000 homes, ranging from small cabins, to larger vacation homes, to full-time residences, many of them accessed by private roads. There are also several campground resorts, with RVs, waterfront condos, or rentals.

== Geography ==
The lake is a widening of Ontario's Mississippi River, which flows east then north through the lake, from waterfalls at Innisville to a dam in Carleton Place. Several small creeks including Cranberry Creek, McCrearys Creek, and McGibbon Creek drain into the lake from adjoining forest and agricultural land. The lake is distinctive for having one side (to the north) that is part of the Canadian Shield, while the other is mostly limestone. The lake is a remnant of the old Champlain Sea, which flooded eastern Ontario at the end of last ice age. The former shoreline of the sea can still be traced inland from the north shore of the lake.

== Human history ==
European settlement of the lake basin began c. 1816 as settlers moved north of the Rideau into areas such as Franktown. Between the 1860s and 1920s, there were steamboats linking Carleton Place to Innisville.

== Ecology ==
The lake has two large and provincially significant wetlands. The larger occurs at the west end of the lake; here the Mississippi River enters the lake through the Innisville wetland, which is also one of the largest wetlands in Lanark County, and is designated an Area of Natural and Scientific Interest. Included within its boundaries is The Mississippi Lake National Wildlife Area. This wetland has large areas of silver maple swamp, flooded only in the spring, and, lower on the shore, important areas of marsh and aquatic vegetation. The western shore of the lake, including Kinch Bay, Code Bay and King Bay, also supports a diverse wetland which ranges from silver maple swamp to large areas of aquatic plants. Loons, bald eagles, osprey and herons are frequently sighted in these habitats. The ospreys and herons also breed inland from the lake, for example in the nearby Scotch Corners Wetland. The provincially significant Blanding's turtle is known from the lake; its long-term survival likely depends upon sufficient nesting areas. Eels were once abundant, but hydroelectric dams downstream have all but eliminated this species from the lake and the watershed.

== See also ==
- List of lakes in Ontario
