= Rockland District High School =

Location
- 1004 St. Joseph Street; Clarence-Rockland, Ontario, K4K 1P6; Canada; 45°32′40″N 75°17′06″W

Information
- School type: Public, Middle school and Secondary school
- Motto: Knowledge, Integrity, Dedication
- Religious affiliation: none
- Founded: 1993
- School board: Upper Canada District School Board
- Area trustee: Caroll Carkner
- School number: 621684, 935425
- Principal: Peter Charles
- Grades: 7–12
- Enrollment: 161 (intermediate), 267 (secondary) (June 2023)
- Team name: Wildcats
- Website: rocklanddhs.ucdsb.on.ca
- Last updated: June 2023

Rockland District High School (other common names are RDHS and RD) is a public intermediate and secondary school in Clarence-Rockland, Ontario, Canada. It is part of the Upper Canada District School Board. The school has offered secondary grades 9-12 since opening, and added intermediate grades 7–8 in the 2012–2013 school year. Two new classrooms were built in the summer of 2012 on the second floor to accommodate the additional grades. The student population is 428 as of June 2023.

== See also ==
- Education in Ontario
- List of secondary schools in Ontario
