= Cristina Danforth =

Iroquois woman

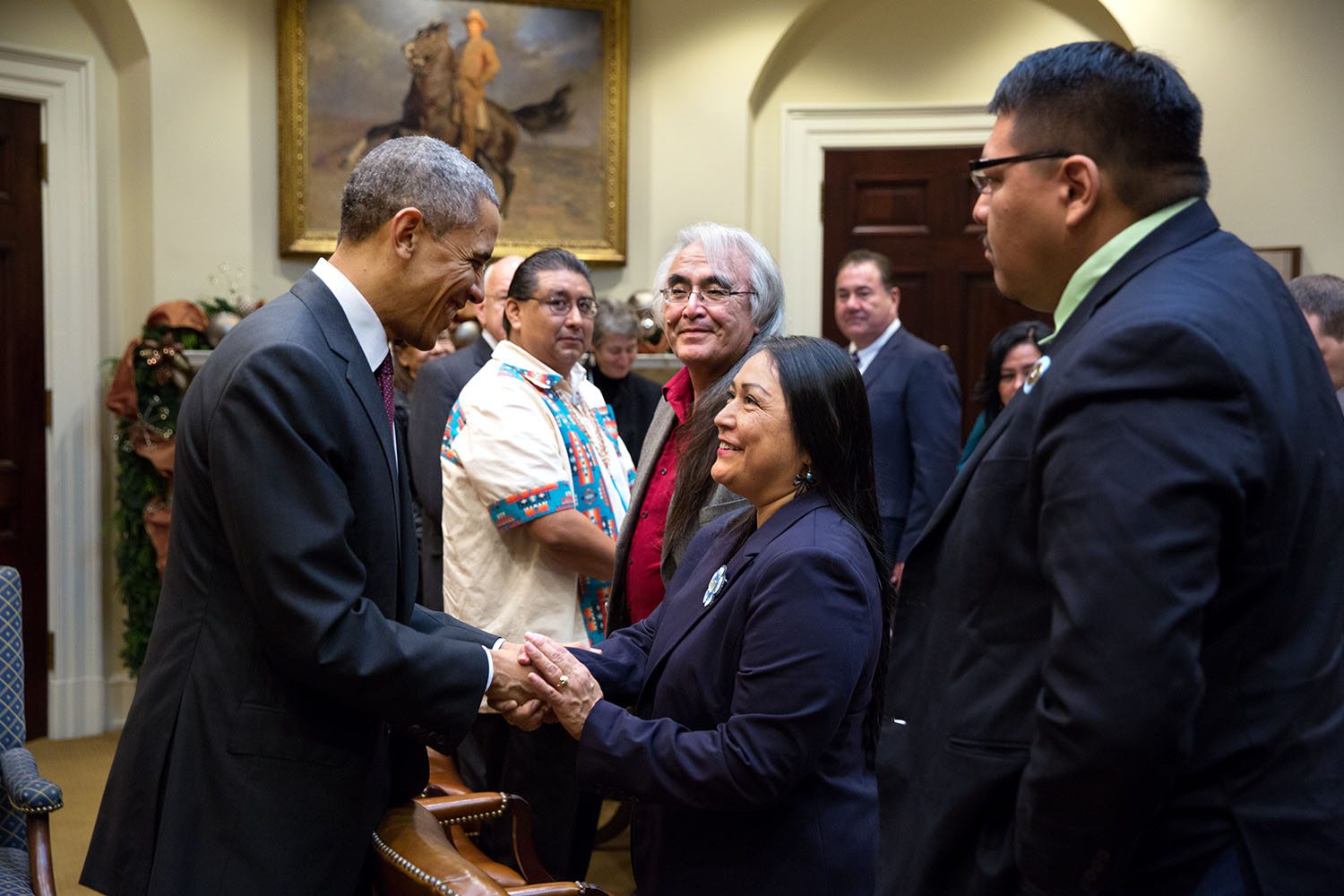
President Barack Obama greets Christina Danforth, Chairwoman Oneida Nation of Wisconsin ahead of the White House Tribal Nation's Conference, December 2, 2014.

Cristina Danforth (Oneida: Kwahlakʌni) is the former Chairwoman of the Oneida Tribe of Indians of Wisconsin.

== See also ==
- Oneida people
- Oneida Indian Nation
- Oneida Nation of the Thames
- Six Nations of the Grand River
