= Laura Cornelius Kellogg =

Oneida author, speaker, and activist from Wisconsin, U.S. (1880–1947

Laura (Miriam) Cornelius Kellogg
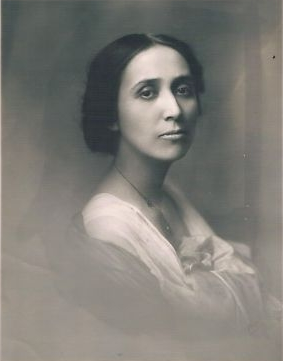
- Kellogg in 1913
- Born: September 10, 1880; Oneida Nation of Wisconsin
- Died: 1947 (aged 66–67)
- Other name: Minnie Kellogg
- Citizenship: Oneida Nation of Wisconsin and U.S.
- Education: Barnard College, Cornell University, the New York School of Philanthropy, Stanford University, and the University of Wisconsin
- Occupations: Native American activist and poet

Laura Cornelius Kellogg (September 10, 1880 – 1947) was an Oneida Nation leader, author, orator, activist, and visionary from Wisconsin. Kellogg was a founder of the Society of American Indians. Kellogg advocated for the cultural renaissance and sovereignty of the Six Nations of the Haudenosaunee. She fought for communal tribal lands, tribal autonomy, and self-government.

Popularly known as "Indian Princess Wynnogene," Kellogg spoke on behalf of the Oneida and other Haudenosaunee people in national and international forums. During the 1920s and 1930s, Kellogg and her husband, Orrin J. Kellogg, pursued land claims in New York on behalf of the Haudenosaunee Six Nations people. Kellogg's "Lolomi Plan" was a Progressive Era alternative to Bureau of Indian Affairs control and emphasized Native American self-sufficiency, cooperative labor, and organization. According to historian Laurence Hauptman, "Kellogg helped transform the modern Iroquois, not back into their ancient League, but into major actors, activists and litigants in the modern world of the 20th century Indian politics."

== Early life ==
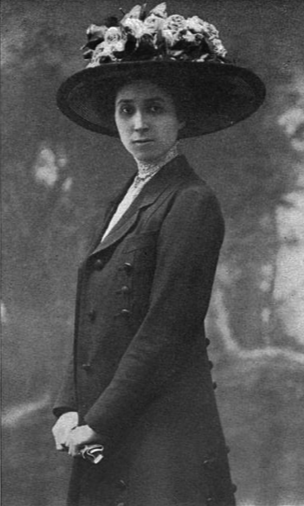
"Minnie" ("Wynnogene") Kellogg

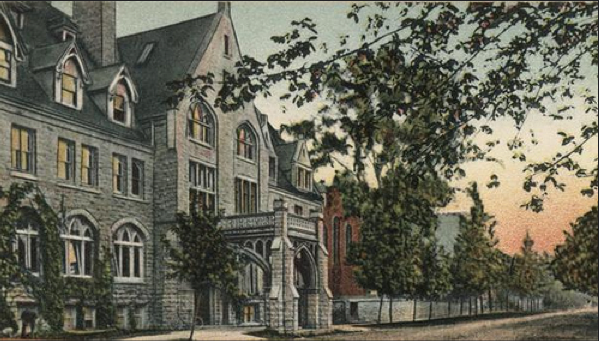
Grafton Hall School, Episcopal Diocese of Fond du Lac, Wisconsin, 1905

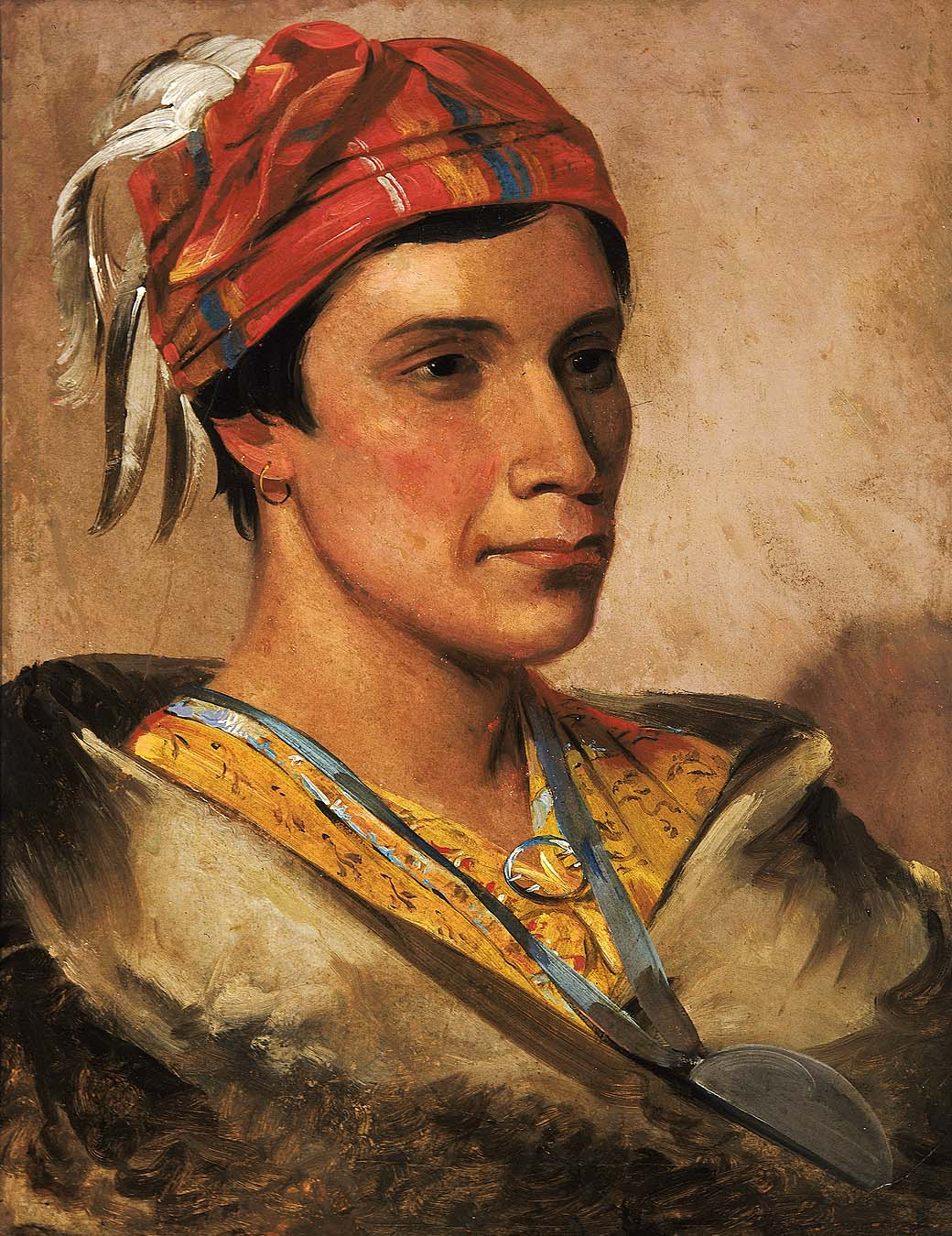
Daniel Bread, Chief of the Oneida, 1831

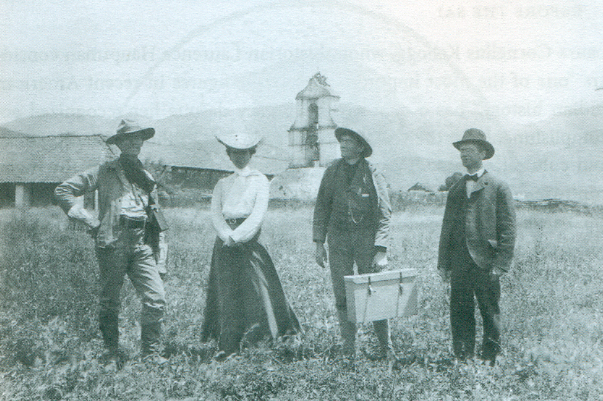
Kellogg in Southern California, 1903

Laura Cornelius Kellogg was born on the Oneida Indian Reservation at Green Bay, Wisconsin, one of five children of Adam Poe and Celicia Bread Cornelius. Her siblings included Chester Poe Cornelius, Alice Cornelius, and Frank Ford Cornelius. Kellogg came from a distinguished lineage of Indian tribal leaders, which is said to have contributed a great deal to her pride of the Oneida heritage. Her paternal grandfather was John Cornelius, Oneida chief and brother of Jacob Cornelius, chief of the Orchard faction of Oneidas. Her maternal grandfather was Chief Daniel Bread, who helped find land for his people after the Oneidas were forcibly removed from New York State to Wisconsin in the early 19th century. Kellogg was also related to Elijah Skenandore, a prominent political figurehead for the Oneida in the 19th century, who was known for his oratorical skills.

Unlike many of her contemporaries on the reservation, Cornelius managed to avoid the usual educational route to distant Indian boarding schools in the East, like Carlisle and Hampton. She attended Grafton Hall, a private finishing school administered by the Episcopal Diocese of Fond du Lac, Wisconsin. The school was within 60 miles of her home at Seymour, Wisconsin, and provided a setting that included mostly non-Indian women. Cornelius attributed her education to both her "time spent at the soup kettle on the reservation", as well as Western institutes of higher learning. This experience left Cornelius feeling more enlightened and enabled her to "appreciate the real values of truth." In 1898, Kellogg graduated with honors. Her graduation essay, "The Romans of America," compared the Haudenosaunee Confederacy to the ancient Roman Empire. Her pride in her Haudenosaunee roots provided her with a strong measure of self-confidence. After Kellogg graduated in 1898, she spent two years traveling around Europe. She later went on to study at Stanford, Barnard College, Columbia, Cornell, and the University of Wisconsin.

"Minnie", as she was known to her friends, taught briefly at the Oneida Indian Boarding School in Oneida, Wisconsin, as well as at the Sherman Institute in Riverside, California, from 1903 to 1905. On May 12, 1903, the Bureau of Indian Affairs evicted a community of Cupeño Indians from their traditional home on the Warner Springs Ranch, some 80 miles southeast of Riverside. Kellogg was reported to have played a crucial role in persuading the Cupeño not to resist relocation to the Pala Reservation, 40 miles away. California newspapers dubbed her "An Indian Heroine" and "The Indian Joan of Arc" for her conciliatory speech reported to have prevented an uprising. The eviction of the Warner Ranch Indians was reported as the crowning crime of the white men against the California Indians who had lawful title to their lands. That year, Kellogg published her only surviving poem, "A Tribute to the Future of My Race," which she recited during the commencement exercises at Sherman Institute. This poem reflects on contact and the relations between European and Indigenous people, noting "Every human heart is human." Of Europeans, she writes kindly and with hope: "Ye spring from noble warrior blood, as brave as Saxon, Roman, Greek, a race of kingly men, May your careers be as complete as the arches of your mater halls."

In 1902, early literary ambitions led to the publication of two stories. "The Legend of the Bean" and "The Sacrifice of the White Dog", in a publication of the Episcopal Church Mission to the Oneidas. In 1903, Kellogg said, "Perhaps it seems strange to an outsider, for I know the ideas that prevail in regards to Indian life, but to do something great when I grew up was impressed upon me from my cradle from my parents, and I've no other ambition and I have known no other ambition."

Between 1898 and 1910, Kellogg continued her education, traveling for two years in Europe and studying at Stanford University, Barnard College, the New York School of Philanthropy, Cornell University, and the University of Wisconsin. At Barnard, she wrote a short story for the college's literary magazine and was mentioned in the college yearbook. Kellogg never finished her education at any of the aforementioned institutions but is still considered by historians to be "among the very best educated [among] Native American women" in her time.

== Princess Wynnogene ==
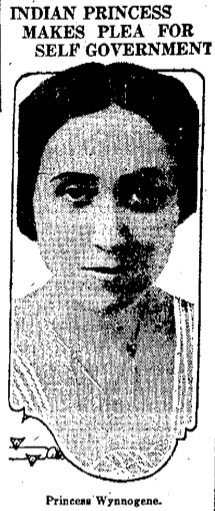
Princess Wynnogene, 1916

Kellogg was the voice of the Oneidas and the Six Nations of the Haudenosaunee on the national and international scene. In 1908, Kellogg embarked on a two-year European journey. In England, she immediately made an impression on British society and the international press. "Wherever she has gone, society has simply 'ovated' her, and were she to remain in England long, she would doubtless be the leader of the circle all her own." While in London, Kellogg requested in a letter to the U.S. Department of the Interior that she be presented at Court. The request was denied, evidently because the American ambassador was disinclined. In 1909, called "Princess Neoskalita" by the Los Angeles Times, Kellogg said she "did not consider her education complete until she had some knowledge of the social life, the art and literature of the French and English." Kellogg also wanted to forge connections and begin a movement in America to work to reorganize Indian affairs. The Des Moines Daily News reported that Kellogg was in London "attempting to set on foot a movement for the improvement her tribe, the Iroquois."

While touring Europe, Kellogg developed a particular interest in the Garden city movement of urban planning in England, Germany, and France, and envisioned the model adapted to reservations to generate Oneida economic self-sufficiency and tribal self-governance. Kellogg would pursue these goals the rest of her life.

Early newspapers dubbed Kellogg "Princess Neoskalita" and "The Indian Joan of Arc." Later press articles billed Kellogg "Indian Princess Wynnogene." "Wynnogene, a real Indian princess, has gone to Washington to be the Joan of Arc for her people. With the Lolomi movement, of which she is the founder, she proposes to lead 300,000 Indians out of what she calls "the bondage of bureaucracy into the self-respect of complete self-government." The Syracuse Herald billed her the "Fighting Squaw of the Six Nations."

By 1911, the national press compared Cornelius and other early leaders of the Society of American Indians to Booker T. Washington in their calls for self-help and the uplift of the "Indian race." As one of the founders of the Society of American Indians, Kellogg asked the leadership to make a commitment to Indian self-sufficiency and independence. While her message did not prove to be overwhelmingly popular, Kellogg did find a constituency among the Haudenosaunee people. After the Society's Columbus meeting in 1911, the New York Tribune hailed Cornelius as a scholar, a social worker, "one of the moving spirits in the new American Indian Association," and "a woman of rare intellectual gifts."

In 1919, Kellogg appeared before the League of Nations calling for justice for American Indians. "You Americans have rescued distracted Belgium from the atrocity of the Hun, you have poured money and sympathy into starving Poland, you have sent your armies into riotous Russia. Through all the world you are mighty righter of wrongs, the savior of oppressed peoples. And in your midst a people have cried in vain."

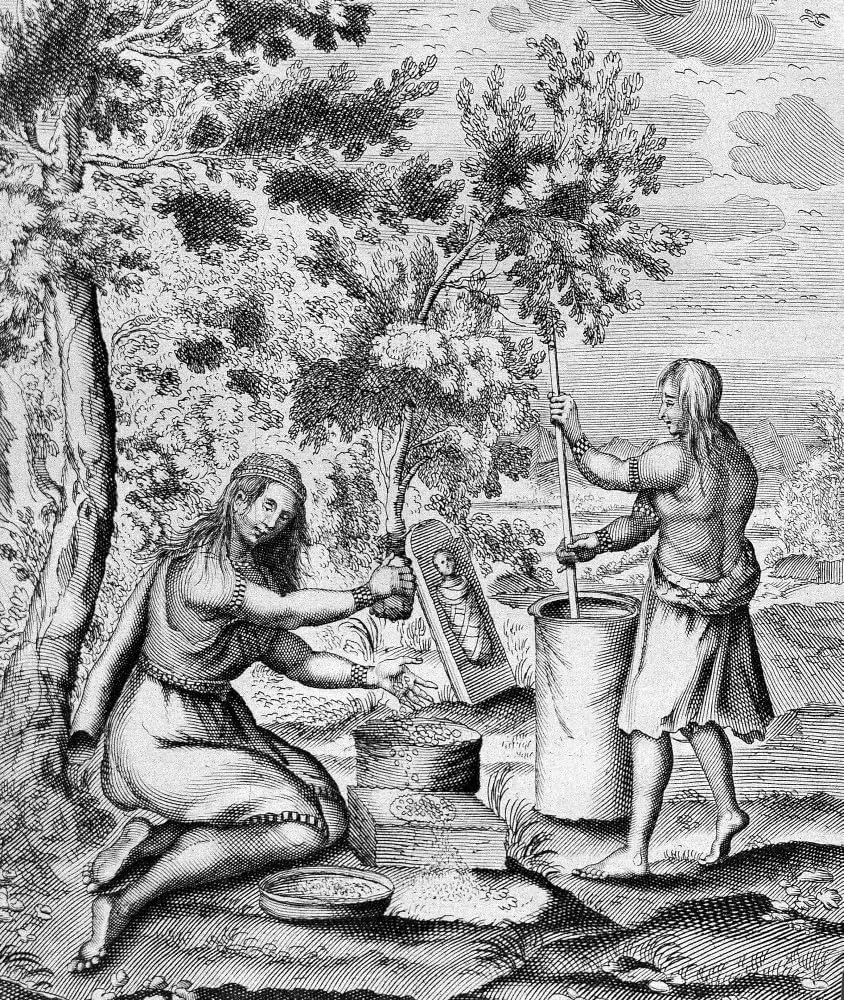
Haudenosaunee Clan Mothers decided any and all issues involving territory, including where a community was to be built and how land was to be used.

The Washington Herald published an interview with Kellogg where she supported women's suffrage, emphasizing Haudenosaunee women's equality of civic powers with the men. Female leaders among the Oneida were not uncommon. "It is a cause of astonishment to us that you white women are only now, in this twentieth century, claiming what has been the Indian woman's privilege as far back as history traces." The Haudenosaunee had a communal system of land distribution, and the tribe gave tracts to clans for further distribution among households for cultivation. Clan Mothers decided any and all issues involving territory, including where a community was to be built and how land was to be used. Since land tracts were the concern of the women, it was the women's job to cultivate food and not the men, The Clan Mothers' Council also reserved certain areas of land to be worked by the women of all the different clans. Food from such lands, called kěndiǔ"gwǎ'ge' hodi'yěn'tho, would be used at festivals and large council gatherings.

Anthropologist William N. Fenton observed Haudenosaunee leadership: "The prophet who would succeed among the Iroquois must speak in ancient tongues, he must use the old words, and he must relate his program to the old ways. He is a conservator at the same time he is a reformer. All of the Iroquois reformers have been traditionalists. This is one of the reasons that the Iroquois culture has endured so long."

== Orrin J. Kellogg ==
On April 22, 1912, Laura Cornelius married Orrin J. Kellogg, an attorney of distant Seneca ancestry. Kellogg's husband supported her work but maintained a low profile; one newspaper wrote the best description of Orrin Kellogg would be "as the husband of Mrs. Kellogg."

Shortly after their marriage, Laura Cornelius Kellogg's loyalty to the Oneida Nation came into question. In a local newspaper called the Tulsa Daily World, an anonymous citizen of the Oneida Nation described Laura Cornelius Kellogg as a "ready borrower" with the "habit of making little touches wherever she finds any of her people". This accusation alluded to Mrs. Kellogg's history of using other people's money to fund her projects. Kellogg's projects were often thought to be very risky, and her critics described them as "self-serving". As a result, both of the Kelloggs were arrested with the charges of "Pretense of Indian Agents with intent to invest Indian funds". The charges against Laura Cornelius Kellogg and her husband were eventually dropped; however, because of her actions, Kellogg was removed from the Society of American Indians (SAI). Reportedly, Kellogg thought her removal was "an injustice and humiliation". Deeply hurt, Kellogg never forgave the SAI.

Kellogg's reputation was not completely ruined. After writing Our Democracy and the American Indian, Kellogg was once again recognized as a "leading crusader for Indian rights".

== Kellogg's thesis ==
Kellogg argued for the value of an "American Indian" identity linked to traditional knowledge of the elders. In 1911, Kellogg declared before the Inaugural Conference of the Society of American Indians, "there are old Indians who have never seen the inside of a classroom whom I consider far more educated than the young Indian with his knowledge of Latin and algebra". She did not consider herself a "new Indian", but an "old Indian adjusted to new conditions". Kellogg criticized Buffalo Bill Cody in New York for his stereotypical performances of Indian people. In contrast to many members of the Society of American Indians, Kellogg wanted Indian children to include the wisdom of the elders and the reservation. She pointed to tenement life in cities where "hollow-chested" men were forced to toil in shops closed to the wind and the sun. She raised the shame of child labor, which robbed children of their childhood and health. "No," she concluded, "I cannot see that everything the white man does is to be copied.

Kellogg was a long-time critic of the Bureau of Indian Affairs, condemning its form of Indian education and crediting her own success to her experience at Grafton Hall:

I had been preserved from the spirit-breaking Indian schools. My psychology, therefore, had not been shot to pieces by that cheap attitude of the Indian Service, whose one aim was to "civilize the race youth, by denouncing his parents, his customs, his people wholesale, and filling the vacuum they had created with their vulgar notions of what constituted civilization. I had none of those processes of the bureaucratic mill in my tender years, to make me into a 'pinch-back white man.'

Kellogg protested that education of Indians needed to involve Native Indian traditional practices and ideologies, describing "noble qualities and traits and a set of literary traditions" that Indians should preserve. She also condemned materialism: "Where wealth is the ruling power and intellectual attainments secondary, we must watch out … that we do not act altogether upon the dictates of a people who have not given sufficient time and thought to our own peculiar problems, and we must cease to be dependent on their estimates of our position". However, Kellogg differed with other reformers who wanted to abolish the Bureau of Indian Affairs. Kellogg believed that the Bureau of Indian Affairs could play a different role, that of guarantor of sovereignty and protector of Native peoples from grafters and petty state politics. Kellogg's outspoken criticism and activities earned her powerful adversaries. There were efforts to discredit Kellogg and she was arrested at least four separate occasions on the series of charges relating to her activities.

Kellogg saw the need for the Haudenosaunee people of the Six Nations to reunite, institute tribal self-government, reclaim communal lands, and promote economic development. Kellogg's "Lolomi Plan" was a vision for the future of Indian reservations which drew upon the Garden city movement, the success of Mormon communities and the enthusiasm and efficiency of Progressive Era organizations. For over twenty years, Kellogg pursued land claims for the Oneida and Six Nations, and worked to develop garden city communities for the Oneida Indian Reservation in Wisconsin and for the Keetoowah Nighthawk Society of Oklahoma. The prospects of successful litigation in New York raised hopes that the Six Nations would have sufficient capital to develop Lolomi communities.

== Society of American Indians ==
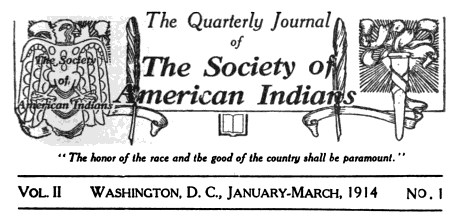
The Society of American Indians was the first national American Indian rights organization run by and for American Indians.

Laura Cornelius Kellogg was a founding member of the Society of American Indians and a member of the first Executive Committee. The Society pioneered twentieth century Pan-Indianism, the movement promoting unity among American Indians regardless of tribal affiliation. The Society was a forum for a new generation of American Indian leaders known as Red Progressives, prominent professionals from the fields of medicine, nursing, law, government, education, anthropology and ministry, who shared the enthusiasm and faith of Progressive Era white reformers in the inevitability of progress through education and governmental action. The Society met at academic institutions, maintained a Washington headquarters, conducted annual conferences and published a quarterly journal of American Indian literature by American Indian authors. The Society was one of the first proponents of an "American Indian Day", and forefront in the fight for Indian citizenship and opening the U.S. Court of Claims to all tribes and bands in United States. The Society of American Indians was the forerunner of modern organizations such as the National Congress of American Indians.

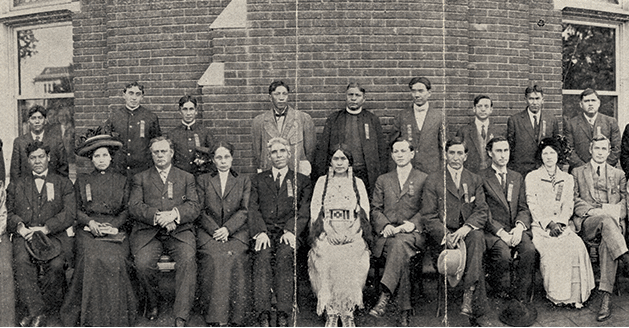
The first conference of the Society of American Indians, Ohio State University, Columbus, Ohio, 1911.

On April 3–4, 1911, at the invitation of Professor Fayette Avery McKenzie, six American Indian intellectuals attended a planning meeting at Ohio State University. According to SAI records, the attendees were Laura Cornelius Kellogg, (Oneida), educator; Dr. Charles Eastman (Santee Dakota), physician; Dr. Carlos Montezuma, (Yavapai-Apache), physician; Thomas L. Sloan, (Omaha), attorney; Charles Edwin Dagenett, (Peoria), Bureau of Indian Affairs supervisor; and Henry Standing Bear (Oglala Lakota), educator.

Shortly after the April meeting, an eighteen-member Temporary Executive Committee formed, including Laura Cornelius Kellogg.

On June 21 and 22, 1911, Kellogg hosted a meeting of the Temporary Executive Committee at her home in Seymour, Wisconsin, to draft a letter announcing the association's formation and purpose. In attendance were prominent Oneida attorneys Chester Poe Cornelius, her brother, and Dennison Wheelock. Charles E. Dagenett had the chair, with Emma Johnson, Rosa LaFlesche and Fayette Avery McKenzie in attendance.

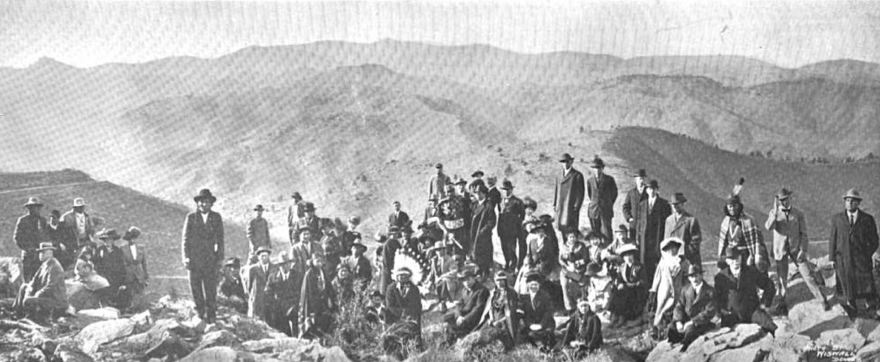
The Society of American Indians, 3rd Annual Conference, A group of members on excursion at Wildcat Point, near Denver, Colorado, October 15, 1913.

On October 12, 1911, at the inaugural meeting of the Society on the campus of the Ohio State University in Columbus, Ohio, Kellogg proclaimed, "I am not the new Indian; I am the old Indian adjusted to new conditions." Kellogg presented a formal paper entitled "Industrial Organization for the Indian", where she proposed turning Indian reservations into self-governing "garden cities" with a "protected autonomy" that would interact with the market economy. Society colleagues were skeptical of her proposal to promote the reservation as a place of opportunity, and many wanted to abolish the Bureau of Indian Affairs. However, Kellogg found a supportive constituency among the Oneida and other tribes.

Society leaders had differing views of Kellogg, as described by Patricia Stovey:

Charles Edwin Dagenett, for example, called her "a visionary full of schemes but not practical." Arthur C. Parker admired her intellect but found the intimidation of her rhetoric, "go my way or I will ruin you," unmanageable. Carlos Montezuma described her as a "cyclone", moving from one issue to another, wanting to do everything "without considering the consequences." However, Rev. Sherman Coolidge remembered her differently. Recalling the first time he heard her speak, Coolidge said, "tears came to his eyes to realize that we had a woman of brilliance among us and to think of the great good she could do for the Indian people."

The Third Annual Meeting of the Society in Denver, Colorado, in 1913, was Kellogg's last conference. Earlier that year, Thomas L. Sloan, an Omaha attorney and Society member, serving as special representative to Senator Joseph T. Robinson's congressional commission to investigate Indian affairs, delegated the Kelloggs as advance investigators. At the time, Oklahoma was a nest of corruption in Indian affairs. On October 11, 1913, after several weeks investigating oil leases at Pawhuska, Oklahoma, the agency of the Osage tribe, the Kelloggs were arrested on orders of a U.S. District Court in Pueblo, Colorado, on charges of obtaining money under false pretenses and impersonating federal officials. The Kelloggs were accompanied by federal agents to Colorado, where they were released on bail. Kellogg asserted that this was a frame-up instigated by the Indian Bureau, "Another move in the game now being played in Osage County between the Department of the Interior, various big factors in the oil world, and the advance guard of the Robinson investigating committee." On January 31, 1914, Judge R. E. Lewis of the U.S. District Court at Denver, Colorado, upon hearing the evidence, ordered the jury to acquit the Kelloggs.

Kellogg's overall political activism seems to have generated scorn from Society conservatives and members employed in the Indian service. While Kellogg was exonerated of any financial wrongdoing, as a result of the arrest she was dismissed from the Society, "an injustice and humiliation she never forgave." After the 1913 Denver Conference, Kellogg was no longer listed as a member of the Society.

== The Lolomi Plan ==
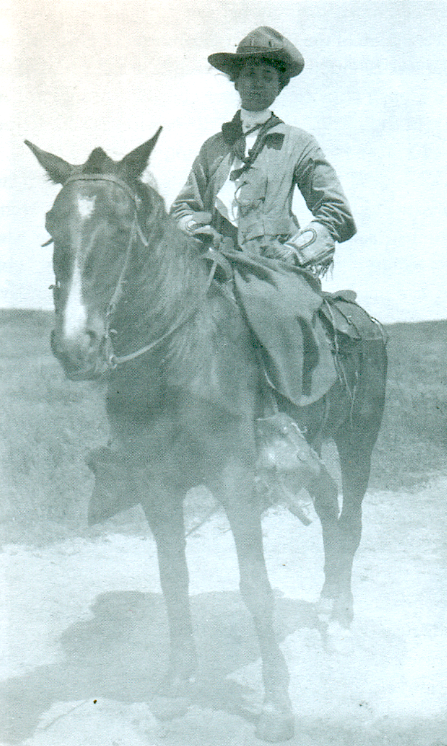
Kellogg in Southern California, 1902

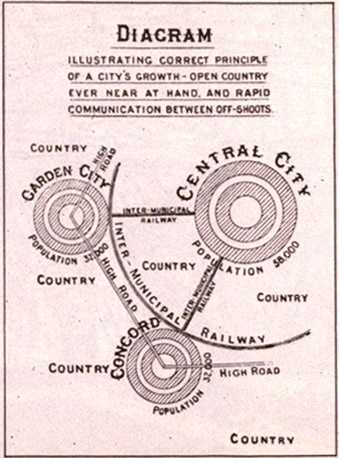
The Garden City, Sir Ebenezer Howard, 1902

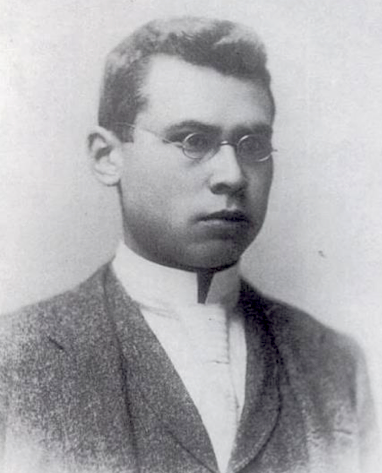
Chester Poe Cornelius

Kellogg's Lolomi Plan was based upon the Garden city movement of urban planning initiated in 1898 by Sir Ebenezer Howard in the United Kingdom. Garden cities were intended to be planned, self-contained communities surrounded by "greenbelts", containing proportionate areas of residences, industry and agriculture. While touring Europe from 1908 to 1910, Kellogg developed a particular interest in garden cities in England, Germany and France, and visioned the model adapted to reservations to generate "Oneida economic self-sufficiency and tribal self-governance".

In short, Kellogg created the Lolomi plan in an attempt to "safeguard the Indian from the horde of white grafters now the bane of Indian existence". The federal government could offer protection for the Indians' assets at the state level. Without the federal government, Kellogg likened the Indian peoples to lambs that would be devoured by a lion. It was to be carried out by a federal entity. The federal authority would collect all of the assets of the tribes and individual Indians. The Indians would then "be enrolled as members of this cooperative body " Each member of the cooperative body would have exactly one vote each. The Lolomi plan would allow the property of the tribes and individuals to be used for "education, health, and commercial development expenses".

The Lolomi plan would create a self-governing body among the community of Indians. Kellogg's plan also included some societal needs such as health care and recreation centers. According to Kellogg, homogeneity, or of the same kind or nature, was the most important aspect of the plan. Kellogg explained, "All successful organization is based on likeness of kind. I believe where white communities have co-operative organizations that have failed, the fact that they were composed of all kinds of race elements has counted largely". The Indian community could resolve issues better than the white communities because of the homogeneity set forth by Lolomi plan.

In 1911, Kellogg made a tour of Indian reservations across the country to promote interest in transforming reservations into garden cities. Mrs. Russell Sage, J.P. Morgan, Charles William Eliot, former president of Harvard University and Mrs. Harry Pratt Judson, wife of the president of the University of Chicago, were listed as some of the prominent persons interested in forming a national industrial council on Indians.

Later in October 1911, Kellogg presented a formal paper entitled "Industrial Organization for the Indian" at the Inaugural Conference of the Society of American Indians in Columbus, Ohio. She proposed turning Indian reservations into self-governing "industrial villages" with a "protected autonomy" that would interact with the local economy. The model adapted contemporary Western ideas to traditional Native values. The type of industry would be geared to local needs, skills, and the stage of development of the particular community. Indians could thus adopt beneficial elements of mainstream society while avoiding such evils as the factory system, urban congestion, and class conflict between labor and capital. "We believe the greatest economy in the world is to be just to all men," she wrote.

In 1914, the Kelloggs moved to Washington, D.C., to devote themselves to lobbying for better Indian legislation. During her career, Kellogg became involved not only in the affairs of the Oneidas and Six Nations, but also those of the Blackfeet, Brothertown, Cherokee, Crow, Delaware, Huron, Osage and Stockbridge Indians. Her crusade and relentless agitation led to trouble with the law and arrests in Oklahoma in 1913 and Colorado in 1916.

In 1916, Kellogg appeared before Congress and testified that the Bureau of Indian Affairs was a corrupt and inefficient administration. She advocated a bill introduced by Senator Harry Lane from Oregon that would abolish the Bureau of Indian Affairs and replace it with a commission, under direct control of Congress, to consist of three men selected from among five nominees chosen by a council of Indians.

The Lolomi Plan drew upon the success of the Mormon communities, the Garden City movement and the momentum of Progressive Era organizations. Lolomi villages would be outside the Bureau's control, managed as private foundation, maintaining lifestyles agreeable to the American Indian through their concentration on outdoor pursuits.

In 1920, Kellogg published a book, Our Democracy and the American Indian: A Presentation of the Indian Situation as It Is Today, where she discussed her Lolomi Plan, later spelled Lolomi, which means "perfect goodness be upon you" in the Hopi language. Her book was "lovingly dedicated" to the memory of Chief Redbird Smith, spiritual leader of the Nighthawk Keetoowah (Cherokee), "who preserved his people from demoralization, and was the first to accept the Lolomi."

During the 1920s and 1930s, Kellogg pursued her Lolomi vision by attempting to purchase the Oneida Indian Boarding School, advising Chief Redbird Smith and the Nighthawk Keetoowah, pursuing land claims on behalf of the Oneida and Six Nations, and reconstituting the 18th-century League of the Iroquois.

== Oneida Cherry Garden City ==
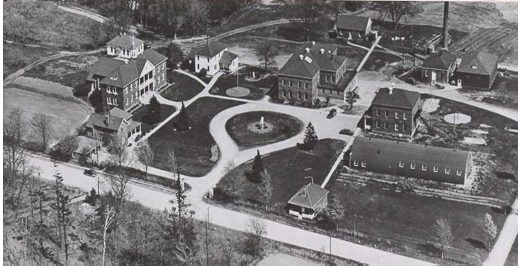
Oneida Indian Boarding School, c.1919

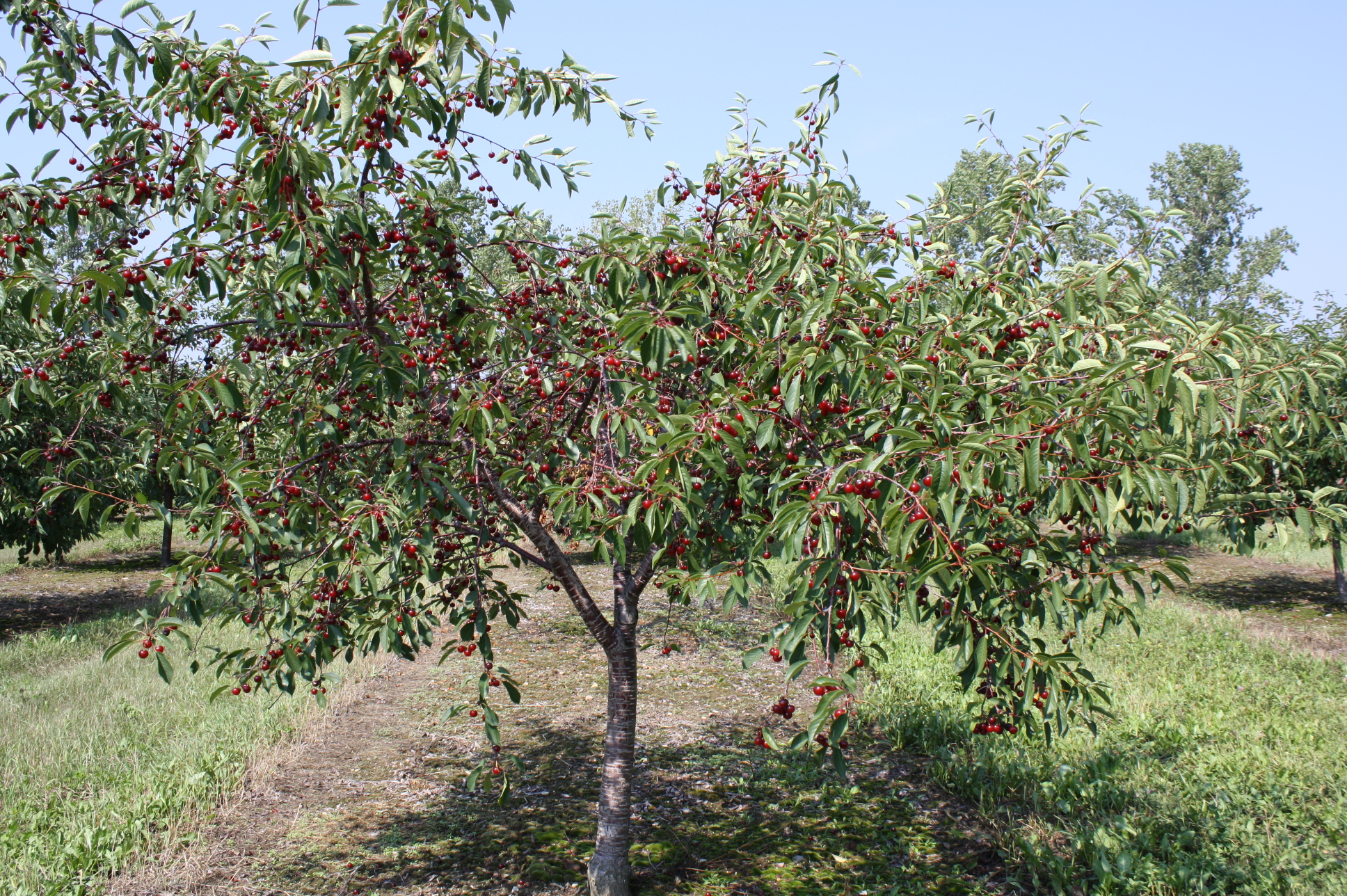
Wisconsin Cherry Trees

In 1919, Kellogg saw an opportunity to develop the Lolomi plan on the Oneida Indian Reservation when the Bureau of Indian Affairs closed the Oneida Boarding School. In 1892, the Oneida Indian Boarding School was built on 80 acres in Oneida, Wisconsin, with federal funds. When the school opened, it accommodated 80 students who stayed for an entire school year. Kellogg traveled back and forth from Wisconsin to Washington, D.C. to meet with Bureau of Indian Affairs Commissioner Cato Sells. Kellogg argued the Oneida Boarding School should continue to provide education to Oneida children and proposed a plan to use the school and grounds as an education and industrial center. Kellogg proposed "Cherry Garden City" for the Oneida using the lands of the Oneida Boarding School. The Oneida homeland was rich cherry-growing area and the construction of canning factory was to be source of economic development. Kellogg argued that the Oneida Boarding School should remain open and offer a curriculum that preserved traditional Oneida culture. The Bureau approved the plan, and Kellogg actively pursued loans from 1919 to 1924. However, because of disagreements within the Oneida, she was unable raise the funds. Her ally attorney Edward A. Everett appealed for extension, but the property was finally sold in the spring of 1924 and immediately given to the Roman Catholic Diocese of Green Bay. Thereafter, Kellogg continued to challenge the government's right to sell the property under treaty agreements. In 1927, Kellogg voiced her continued pursuit of Lolomi for the Oneidas in an article for the Syracuse Herald. Today, the former location of the Oneida Boarding School is the present site of the Norbert Hill Center of the Oneida Tribe of Indians of Wisconsin.

== Keetoowah Nighthawk Society ==
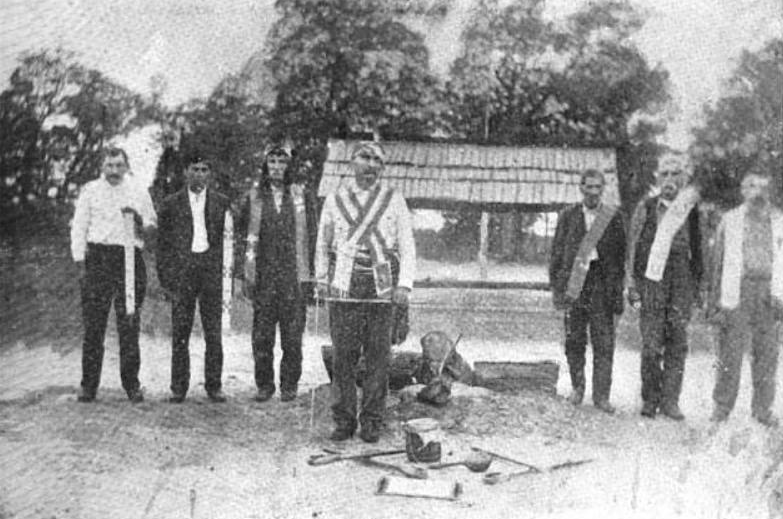
The Council of the Keetoowah Nighthawk Society, 1916.

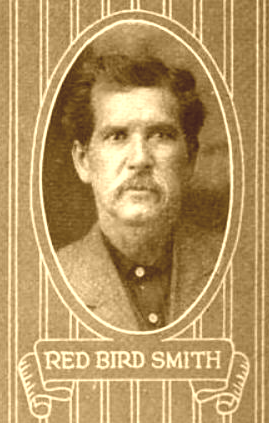
Chief Red Bird Smith

From 1914 to 1923, Kellogg and her older brother Chester Poe Cornelius managed a Lolomi Plan for the Keetoowah Nighthawk Society in Oklahoma. In July 1914, Minnie and Chester met Redbird Smith (Cherokee) and his delegation while in Washington, D.C. Redbird Smith was the spiritual leader of the Keetoowah Nighthawk Society, a traditionalist Cherokee faction who lived in isolated communities in the Wild Horse Mountains of Northeastern Oklahoma. The Keetoowah Nighthawk Society secretly practiced the traditional ceremonies and gatherings of the pre-removal Cherokee culture, and resisted assimilation, allotment and dissolution of tribal government. After their meeting in Washington, Smith invited Minnie and Chester to implement and manage a Lolomi Plan for the Nighthawk Keetoowah. In 1915, Chester Cornelius returned to Oklahoma to join Chief Smith and the Society. The Keetoowah gave Minnie the Cherokee name "Egahtahyen" ("Dawn") and power of attorney to act on their behalf to establish a communal enterprise. Cornelius, known as "C.P.", became the spokesman for the Society, managed the Lolomi plan for Redbird Smith and worked to get the Ketoowah Society a reservation. In 1916, through the efforts of the Kelloggs and local congressmen, a bill was introduced into Congress to allow the Ketoowah Society to incorporate as an industrial community, but it failed to pass. In 1917, Cornelius pressed forward with the Lolomi plan. A herd of Black Angus cattle was purchased from the Oneida Stock Farm in Wisconsin and driven to Oklahoma, and many people from the area around Jay, Oklahoma, moved south and settled near Gore, Oklahoma. The Keetoowah Nighthawk Society placed great trust in Cornelius in matters of ritual and religion. He was an Indian and well-educated. During this time, Cornelius helped the Keetoowah reestablish in some way the old tribal organization of the Cherokee Nation.

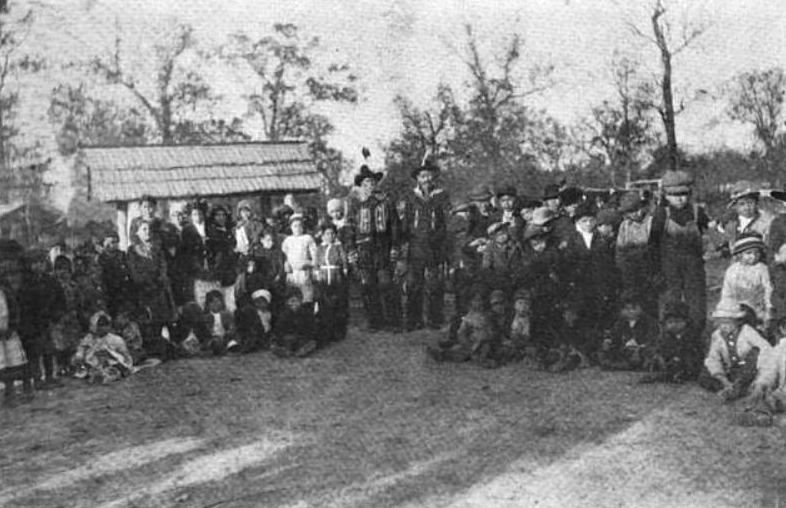
Keetoowah Nighthawk Society leaders Redbird Smith and Bluford Sixkiller instructing children in Cherokee rituals, 1921

In November 1918, Redbird Smith died at the age of 68. Sam Smith, one of the sons of Redbird Smith, became chief of the Nighthawk Keetoowah Society, while Cornelius continued as spokesman and legal counsel. Restrictions were removed from several allotments, and they were mortgaged to fund and establish a bank in Gore with Cornelius as president.

In 1920, Minnie Kellogg's book Our Democracy and the American Indian was "lovingly dedicated" to the memory of Chief Redbird Smith, spiritual leader of the Nighthawk Keetoowah, "who preserved his people from demoralization, and was the first to accept the Lolomi." In 1921, a hundred Cherokees from 35 families moved together to the southeastern corner of Cherokee County, Oklahoma, to create a traditional community.

By 1923, the Lolomi plan was progressing. Chester told the Daily Oklahoman that he wanted the Keetoowah some day to be "in a position where they can work for the common good and build up a surplus for the good of the community." However, shortly thereafter, the bank at Gore failed. The cattle herd was taken by creditors and those who had mortgaged their allotments lost their land. In the post World War I depression of the early 1920s, many sound banks and businesses failed, and the circumstances appear to have been beyond Kellogg's diligence. George Smith, fifth son of Redbird Smith, recalled, "C.P. was awful smart. You couldn't get ahead of him. The white people was scared of him all the time, watching what he was doing with the Keetoowahs. He was a good man, but the white people were against him, and we had some bad luck." After the collapse of the Lolomi Plan, some Keetoowahs believed that Cornelius cheated them and he was dismissed as spokesman for the Ketoowah Society In 1925, Cornelius was raised as a chief of the Oneida Nation of Wisconsin, and continued to reside in Gore, Oklahoma, and play a role with his sister in national Indian affairs.

== New York Land Claims ==
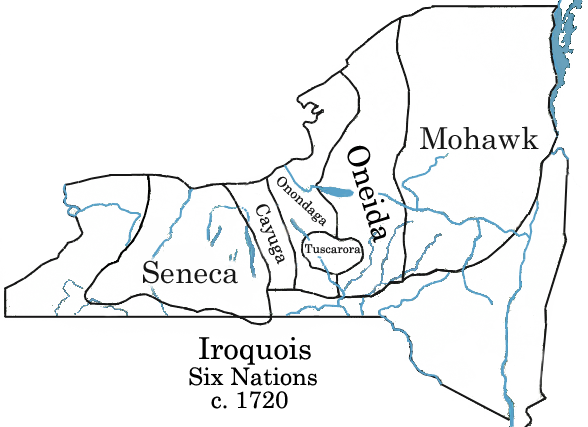
HHaudenosaunee map, c. 1720

=== The Oneida people ===
The Dawes Act of 1887 destroyed the Wisconsin Oneida's tribal land base, and the New York Oneida had lost almost all their land in the 18th and 19th centuries. The Oneidas, under pressure from state and federal governments, were uprooted from New York in the 1820s and 1830s. Many relocated into the province of Upper Canada, others migrated to the territory of Wisconsin and some remained in New York. Treaties and actions by the State of New York drastically reduced the Oneida land to 32 acres (0.13 km^{2}). The Wisconsin Oneida formed the Oneida Nation of Wisconsin and maintained ties to the Six Nations of the Haudenosaunee in New York State and Ontario.

=== Six Nations land claims ===
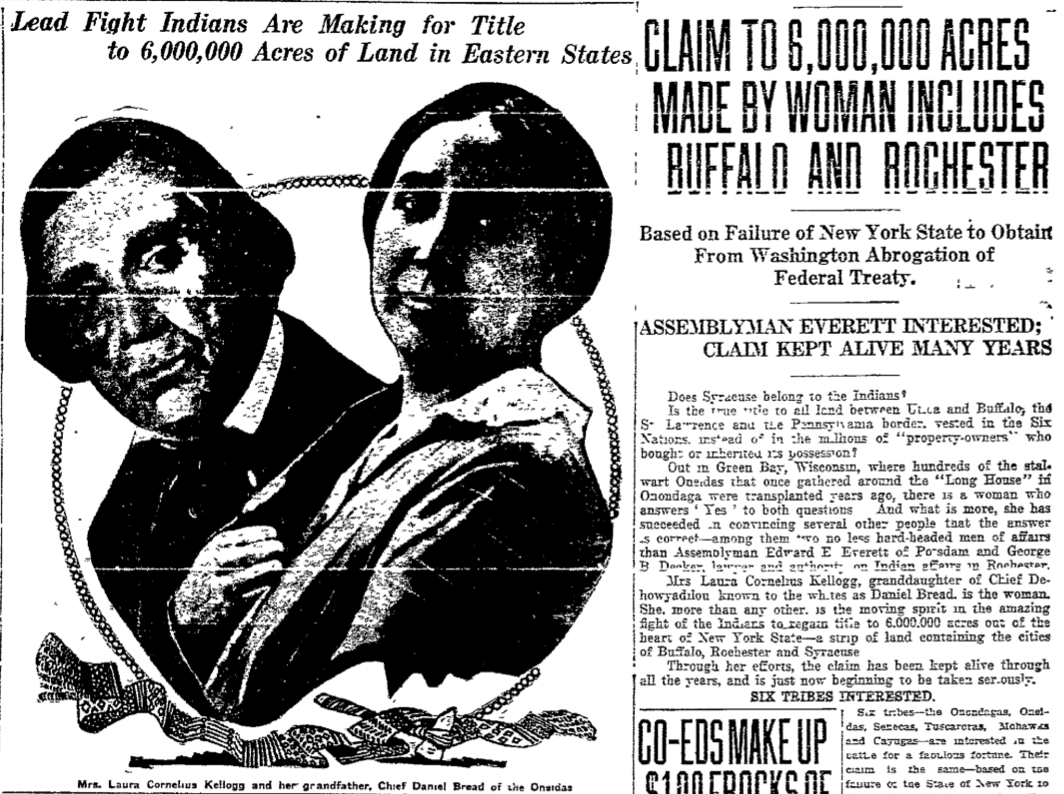

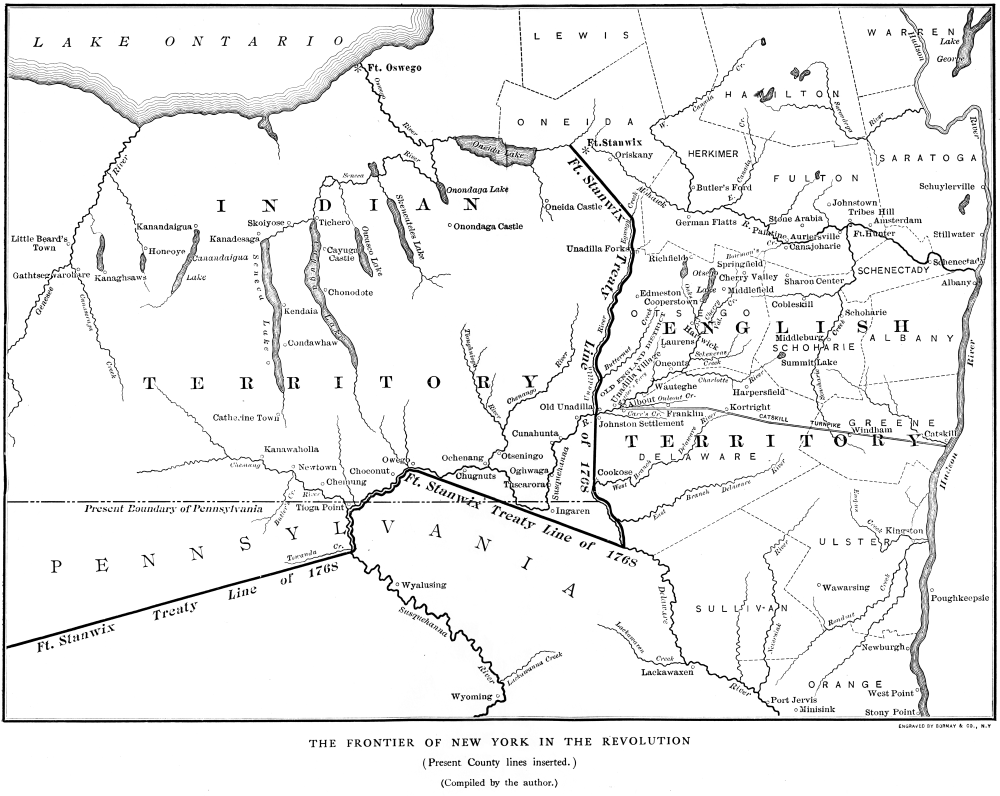
Fort Stanwix Treaty

In 1922 –a benchmark year for Kellogg – her clan mother died. Soon afterward, Kellogg decided to return to the traditional practices of her tribe. During this time, Kellogg focused on two major issues: compliance with the Six Nations Laws and the advancement of land claiming rights. Also in 1922, the United States Court of Appeals for the Second Circuit, in U.S. v. Boylan, denied New York state courts jurisdiction to dispose of Indian property or remove Indians without the consent of the federal government, returned a thirty-two acre parcel of land within the city of Oneida, New York, and confirmed the U.S. government's right to represent the Indians as well as the state's limited authority in Indian matters. In March 1922, the U.S. Supreme Court refused to hear the Boylan case, thereby upholding the federal appeals court ruling. On March 17, 1922, Assemblyman Edward A. Everett, of Potsdam, New York, Chairman of the New York State Indian Commission (1919–1922), presented the Everett Report, officially known as the Report of the New York State Commission to Investigate the Status of the American Indian Residing in the State of New York. After a four-year study from 1919 to 1922, the Everett Report concluded the Haudenosaunee Six Nations were entitled to 6,000,000 acres (2,400,000 ha) in New York, due to illegal dispossession after the 1784 Treaty of Fort Stanwix. The report was promptly rejected by the legislature, and Everett stripped of his chairmanship. The Boylan decision and the Everett Report buoyed Kellogg and her supporters with the hope of successfully reclaiming Oneida and Six Nations lands in New York State and Pennsylvania.

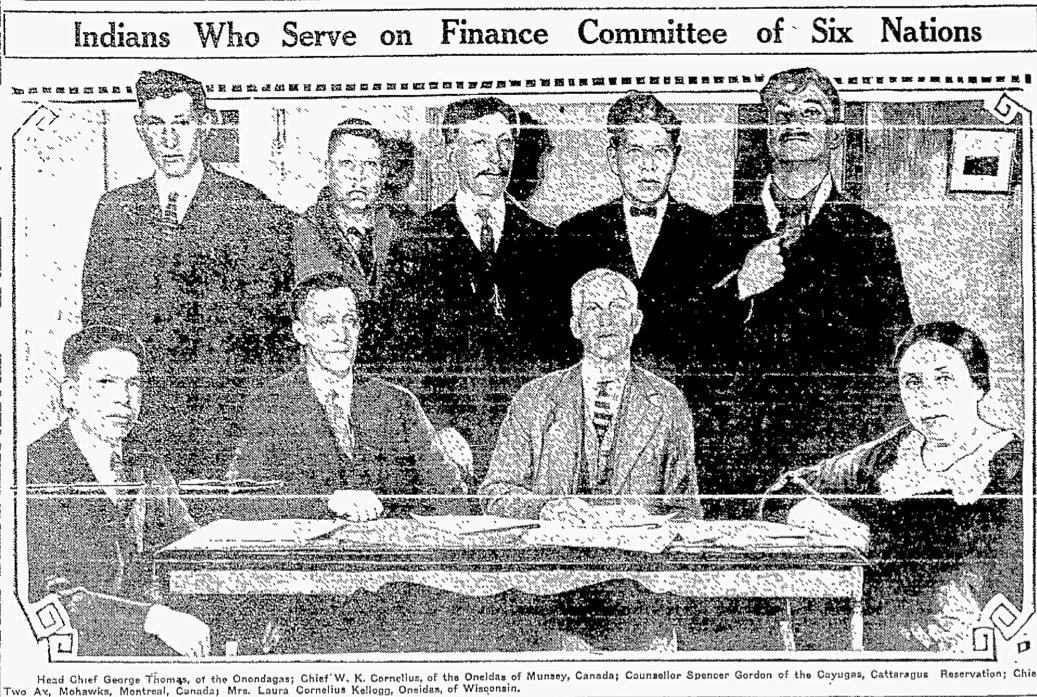
Six Nations Finance Committee, 1924

In October 1922, after an extensive investigation and report by Kellogg, the Oneida Nation of Wisconsin announced that they would pursue a claim for 6 million New York acres of land valued at $2 billion. A Committee of 22 was appointed to prosecute claim, and Kellogg was appointed secretary to raise funds for the undertaking. Kellogg and her husband set up a headquarters at Onondaga, New York, the traditional capital of the Six Nations, and spoke at public forums in Haudenosaunee communities in New York, Quebec, Ontario, Wisconsin, and Oklahoma to gather support and funds. In November 1922, Kellogg attended a meeting of the Indian Welfare League in Albany, in which Assemblyman Everett was chastised by both Indian and non-Indian reformers for his report, including his actions which allegedly stirred up false hope among Indians about the land claims issue. In a column of the Knickerbocker Press, Kellogg reacted to the meeting by defending Everett. She added that the real question was not the workings of the Everett Commission, but the legal status of the Six Nations according to Treaty of Fort Stanwix of 1784 granting the Haudenosaunee Confederacy independence. Less than a week later, Kellogg sent Everett a letter endorsing his report, condemning the Indian Welfare League, and making an offer to retain his legal services for in future litigation. Edward A. Everett, Chairman of the New York State Indian Commission who was defeated for reelection because of his support for the Indians, would serve as legal counsel.

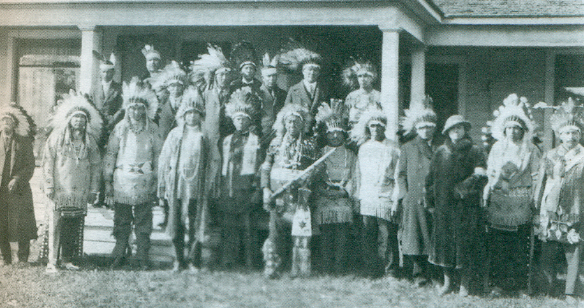
Kellogg and Oneida Chiefs, 1925

Kellogg traveled throughout the Six Nations to raise funds to litigate claims to Haudenosaunee lands, and her followers became known as the "Kellogg Party" throughout the U.S. and Canada. They collected money from Haudenosaunee in New York, Oklahoma, Wisconsin, Ontario and Quebec, stating it would be used to claim up to 18 million acres of land in New York and Pennsylvania. Collections were also received from the Stockbridge Indians, the Brothertowns and a number of white business people in the Green Bay area. These monies were not used for the purported purpose, nor were they returned to contributors, and many Indians filed protests with the federal government and with tribal elders.

In 1925, Kellogg organized a ceremony recognizing Oneida chiefs and calling for federal protection while simultaneously exercising tribal governance.

=== Opposition to Kellogg ===
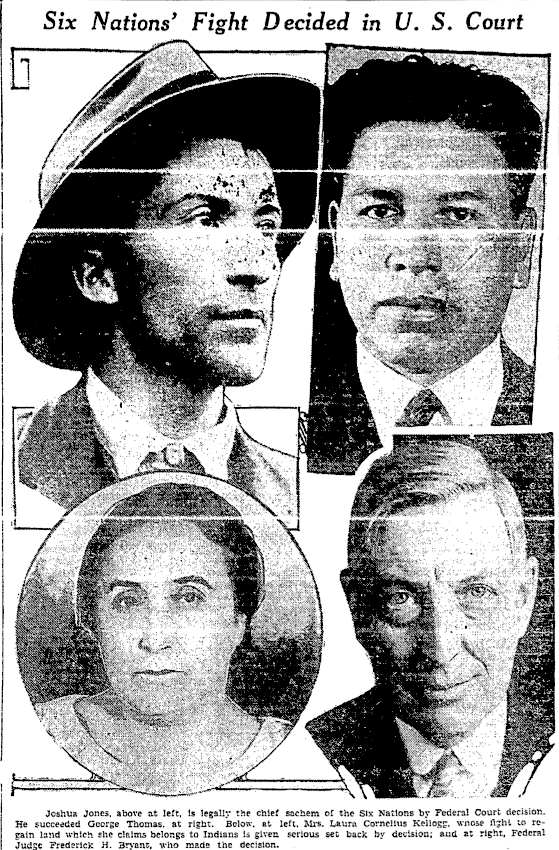
Six Nations Fight Decided in U.S. Court, 1929

Kellogg's campaign in New York was fraught with problems, and there was strong resistance from local, state and federal government, and pressure on Six Nations leadership to halt Kellogg's initiative. As a result, there was publicized in-fighting among and within the tribes and efforts to discredit Kellogg's efforts and reputation. In 1925, Kellogg, her husband and Chief Wilson K. Cornelius of the Oneida Nation of the Thames, were arrested in Canada.

There was also a succession of set-backs and defeats in the courts. In October 1927, a class action suit, James Deere v. St. Lawrence River Power, filed in 1925 in United States District Court for the Northern District of New York on behalf of the Six Nations to eject a subsidiary of Alcoa Aluminum and other occupants from a small parcel of land, was dismissed for lack of jurisdiction. Kellogg lost a suit for control of Onondaga Nation tribal funds in 1927. On December 23, 1928, Edward A. Everett, Kellogg's ally and chief legal counsel died.

In 1929, Kellogg sought the intervention of the U.S. Congress, and with the help of John Collier of the American Indian Defense Association, managed to get a hearing for Haudenosaunee leaders before the Senate Subcommittee on Indian Affairs. Once again she spoke in proud terms of the Six Nations, of her plans for their economic, political and spiritual revival, of her hatred for the Bureau, whom she now accused of spreading pernicious and criminal propaganda against her and the Haudenosaunee. On March 1, 1929, Kellogg testified,

Here are a group of Indians [Haudenosaunee], 16,000 in all, occupying some 78,000 acres in reservations in New York or colonized in small groups in Western states and Canada. Their legal status is peculiar to Indian relations. They have the status of an independent protectorate of United States under this Treaty of 1784, confirmed and added too in the original treaty of 1789. They are a protected autonomy, with the title of original territory vested in them. In specific language, the U.S. ceded all right and title to them the territory they reserved to themselves out of their Haudenosaunee domain in return for their ceding all right and title in the Ohio Valley to the United States government.

However, Kellogg's testimony alienated most of the senators, and E. B. Merritt, Assistant Commissioner of Indian Affairs accused Kellogg of fraud and tried to launch a federal investigation.

On August 29, 1929, Kellogg suffered another serious set back when Judge Frederick Howard Bryant of the United States District Court for the Northern District of New York ruled upon the leadership the dispute within the Six Nations and declared that Joshua Jones legal sachem of the Six Nations. Jones, an opponent of Kellogg, succeeded George Thomas a long-tine supporter of Kellogg. By this time, subsequent court appeals were unsuccessful and many Haudenosaunee supporters were angry that their financial support did not bring any results, and Kellogg's long campaign lost momentum. Nevertheless, Kellogg's rival council attempted to operate well into the late 1930s. On July 4, 1937, Kellogg speaking at a Six Nations council in Hogansville, New York, spoke of her continued pursuit, "The Iroquois are struggling for a renaissance. If we were permitted the return of self-rule, we could place before the world an example of perfect government."

== Later years ==
Kellogg continued her fight for the renaissance and sovereignty of the Haudenosaunee Six Nations the rest of her life. Kellogg lived out her remaining days on welfare. She died in New York City in 1947.

== Legacy ==
Laura Cornelius Kellogg was an advocate for the cultural renaissance and sovereignty of the Haudenosaunee Six Nations, and remains a controversial figure in 20th-century Haudenosaunee politics in the U.S. and Canada. During the 1920s and 1930s, every Haudenosaunee reservation in the United States and Canada was affected by Kellogg, with many elders perceiving her as a swindler who created divisions among their people. A case in point was the feuding rival councils of the Onondaga. Since Kellogg's efforts in the 1920s and 1930s, litigation on Oneida claims in New York continues and several cases have been decided by the United States Supreme Court. While Kellogg never fulfilled the expectations of her followers, her Lolomi Plan was a Progressive Era alternative to Bureau of Indian Affairs control, and presaged subsequent 20th-century movements to reclaim communal lands, institute tribal self-government and promote economic development. Kellogg's Lolomi vision is realized in the success of the Oneida Tribe of Indians of Wisconsin. Land holdings by the Oneida Tribe of Indians of Wisconsin have increased since the mid-1980s from approximately 200 acres to more than 18,000 acres. The economic impact on Brown County, Outagamie County and the metropolitan Green Bay, Wisconsin, area is estimated in excess of $250 million annually.
