= Oneida Nation of Wisconsin =

Native American tribe

Coordinates: 44°29′12″N 88°12′20″W

Oneida Nation
Onʌyoteˀa·ká· (Oneida)
- Oneida Nation tribal seal

Total population
- 16,567 (2010)

Regions with significant populations
- Wisconsin

Languages
- English, Oneida

Religion
- Christianity, Native

Related ethnic groups
- Oneida Indian Nation of New York, Oneida Nation of the Thames, Oneida First Nation, other Haudenosaunee peoples

The Oneida Nation (Oneida: Onʌyoteˀa·ká·) is a federally recognized tribe of Oneida people in Wisconsin. The tribe's reservation spans parts of two counties west of the Green Bay metropolitan area. The reservation was established by treaty in 1838, and was allotted to individual New York Oneida tribal members as part of an agreement with the U.S. government. The land was individually owned until the tribe was formed under the Indian Reorganization Act of 1934.

Under the Dawes Act, the land was allotted in 1892 to individual households. The nation kept control of most of the land until sales were allowed in the early 20th century, when members were often tricked out of their property. They used the land for farming and harvesting timber. As of 2010, the nation controlled about 35 percent of the land within its reservation and is working to reacquire the rest.

In 1988 the nation established the state's first modern lottery, known as Big Green. Since the late 20th century, the nation developed the gaming Ashwaubenon Casino on its property, which is generating revenue for economic development and welfare. Of the more than 16,000 members, roughly half live on the reservation.

== History ==
The Oneida Nation is an Indigenous Iroquoian-speaking nation who relocated to northeastern Wisconsin beginning in the 1820s. The Oneida were one of the original Five Nations of the Haudenosaunee (Iroquois) Confederacy, with ancestral homelands in present-day New York. During the early 1800s, the state of New York and land speculators forced the Oneida to sell large portions of their lands, reducing their homeland from approximately six million acres to only 32 acres by the 1830s.

=== Relocation to Wisconsin and the Menominee land dispute ===
In 1821, a delegation led by Eleazer Williams, an Episcopalian missionary of Mohawk descent, arrived in Green Bay backed by the Episcopal Church and the federal government. Williams had a plan to create a Christian "Indian empire" in the West with himself as leader. Williams negotiated with the Menominee and Ho-Chunk for approximately 860,000 acres. The following year, another delegation negotiated a second treaty claiming an additional 6.72 million acres on the western shore of Lake Michigan.

The Menominee and Ho-Chunk immediately protested both treaties. They argued that none of their principal chiefs had been present at the 1821 or 1822 treaty councils, that the interpreter at the 1822 treaty had misinformed them of the terms, and that they had only intended to allow the Oneida, Stockbridge, and Brothertown to reside on the land—not to transfer ownership. Federal records preserve Menominee and Ho-Chunk testimony: "We never intended to sell any land," "None of our chiefs were present," and "We were deceived about what the treaties said."

The Menominee and Ho-Chunk protested so strongly that the United States Senate refused to ratify either the 1821 or 1822 treaty. This set off an eight-year dispute, with the Menominee and Ho-Chunk on one side and the Oneida, Stockbridge-Munsee, and Brothertown on the other. The federal government mediated the conflict and negotiated a series of three compromise treaties in 1831 and 1832, in which the Menominee agreed to cede 500,000 acres of land to the Oneida. The federal government subsequently reduced this cession to only 65,400 acres in 1838, which constitutes the current boundaries of the Wisconsin Oneida reservation.

=== Reservation era ===
By a treaty in 1838, the Oneida accepted a reservation, and chief Daniel Bread negotiated to ensure that the land was to be held communally by the tribe. By 1838, approximately 654 Oneida lived on the new reservation. A small group of Oneida remained on the reservation in New York, while others later moved to Ontario, Canada.

The federal government opened Wisconsin for settlement by Euro-Americans in 1834, and soon settlers flooded the region. In 1845, Wisconsin territorial governor Henry Dodge asked the Oneida to trade their Wisconsin lands for land west of the Mississippi. Some Oneida were willing to move farther west, but Orchard Party leader Jacob Cornelius refused to negotiate any new removal, and the Oneida stayed in Wisconsin.

Oneida activists from Wisconsin and New York such as Laura Cornelius Kellogg (1880–1947) would make continual efforts to uphold Indian land claims.

== 20th century ==
=== Great Depression ===
During the Great Depression, the Works Progress Administration organized the Federal Writers' Project, which produced state guides and also helped preserve much of Oneida culture. Its Oneida Language and Folklore Project gathered hundreds of stories and material about their culture.

=== Termination period ===
In the period between World War II and The Sixties the US government followed a policy of Indian Termination for its Native citizens. In a series of laws, attempting to mainstream tribal people into the greater society, the government strove to end the U.S. government's recognition of tribal sovereignty, eliminate trusteeship over Indian reservations, and implement state law applicability to native persons. In general the laws were expected to create taxpaying citizens, subject to state and federal taxes as well as laws, from which Native people had previously been exempt.

On August 13, 1946, the Indian Claims Commission Act of 1946, Pub. L. No. 79-726, ch. 959, was passed. Its purpose was to settle for all time any outstanding grievances or claims the tribes might have against the U.S. for treaty breaches, unauthorized taking of land, dishonorable or unfair dealings, or inadequate compensation. Claims had to be filed within a five-year period, and most of the 370 complaints that were submitted were filed at the approach of the 5-year deadline in August, 1951.

On 1 August 1953, United States Congress issued a formal statement, House Concurrent Resolution 108, which was the formal policy presentation announcing the official federal policy of Indian termination. The resolution called for the "immediate termination of the Flathead, Klamath, Menominee, Potawatomi, and Turtle Mountain Chippewa, as well as all tribes in the states of California, New York, Florida, and Texas." All federal aid, services, and protection offered to Native people were to cease, and the federal trust relationship and management of reservations would end. Individual members of terminated tribes were to become full United States citizens with all the rights, benefits and responsibilities of any other United States citizen. The resolution also called for the Interior Department to quickly identify other tribes who would be ready for termination in the near future.

A January 21, 1954 memo by the Department of the Interior advised that a bill for termination was being prepared including "about 3,600 members of the Oneida Tribe residing in Wisconsin. Another memo of the Department of the Interior memo entitled Indian Claims Commission Awards Over $38.5 Million to Indian Tribes in 1964, states that the Emigrant Indians of New York are "(now known as the Oneidas, Stockbridge-Munsee, and Brotherton Indians of Wisconsin)".

In an effort to fight termination and force the government into recognizing their outstanding land claims from New York, the three tribes began filing litigation in the 1950s. As a result of a claim filed with the Indian Claims Commission, the group was awarded a settlement of $1,313,472.65 on August 11, 1964. To distribute the funds, Congress passed Public Law 90-93; 81 Stat. 229; Emigrant New York Indians of Wisconsin Judgment Act and prepared separate rolls of persons in each of the three groups to determine which tribal members had at least one-quarter "Emigrant New York Indian blood." It further directed tribal governing bodies of the Oneidas and Stockbridge-Munsee to apply to the Secretary of the Interior for approval of fund distributions, thereby ending termination efforts for these tribes. With regard to the Brothertown Indians, however, though the law did not specifically state they were terminated, it authorized all payments to be made directly to each enrollee with special provisions for minors to be handled by the Secretary, though the payments were not subject to state of federal taxes.

== Reservation ==
Map depicting the area that makes up the Oneida Nation in Wisconsin in 2016

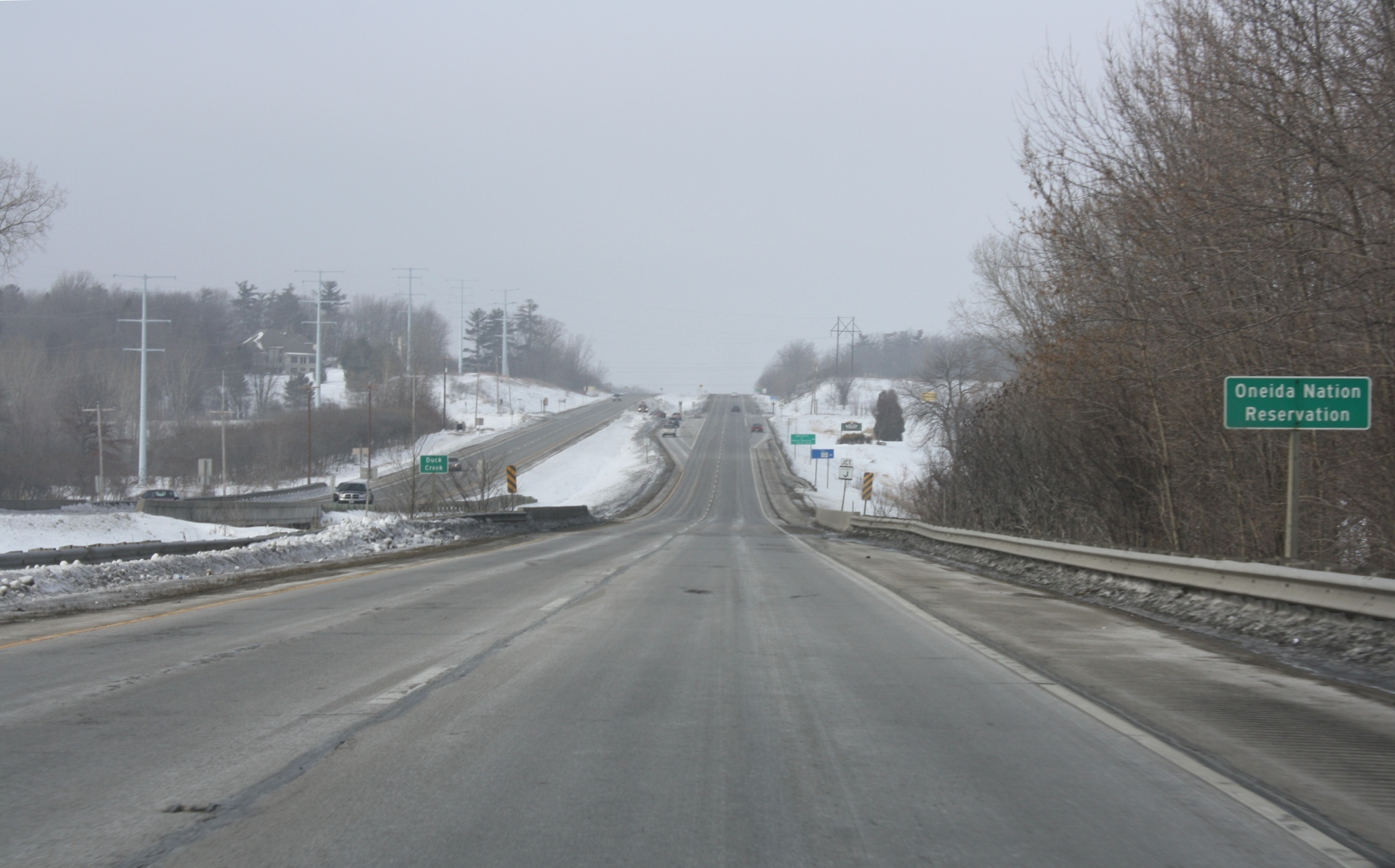
Road entering the Oneida Reservation in Oneida, Wisconsin

The Oneida Reservation (Oneida: ukwehuwé:ne) comprises portions of eastern Outagamie and western Brown counties. The shape of the reservation is an angled rectangle directed to the northeast, laid out along the Fox River, which runs in the same direction. According to the U.S. Census Bureau, the reservation has a total area of 102.27 square miles (264.88 km^{2}), of which 102.14 square miles (264.5 km^{2}) is land and 0.13 square miles (0.3 km^{2}) is water.

Only about 23,122 acres (93.6 km^{2}), or slightly over 35% of the Oneida Reservation, was tribally-owned as of 2010. Most of the reservation passed out of tribal ownership due to federal policies of allotment in the late nineteenth century, allowing a large non-native population to settle within the reservation boundaries. Much of the east side of the reservation has been incorporated into the city of Green Bay (Oneida: kanatá:ke) and villages of Hobart and Ashwaubenon. The west side of the reservation contains the unincorporated community of Oneida. The Oneida Nation is actively working to reacquire more land within its reservation boundaries.

=== Reservation demographics ===
As of the census of 2020, the population living on the Oneida Reservation was 27,110. The population density was 264.1 inhabitants per square mile (102.0/km^{2}). There were 10,647 housing units at an average density of 103.7 per square mile (40.0/km^{2}). The racial makeup of the reservation was 71.4% White, 16.8% Native American, 2.3% Asian, 1.5% Black or African American, 0.1% Pacific Islander, 1.2% from other races, and 6.7% from two or more races. Ethnically, the population was 5.1% Hispanic or Latino of any race.

== Government ==
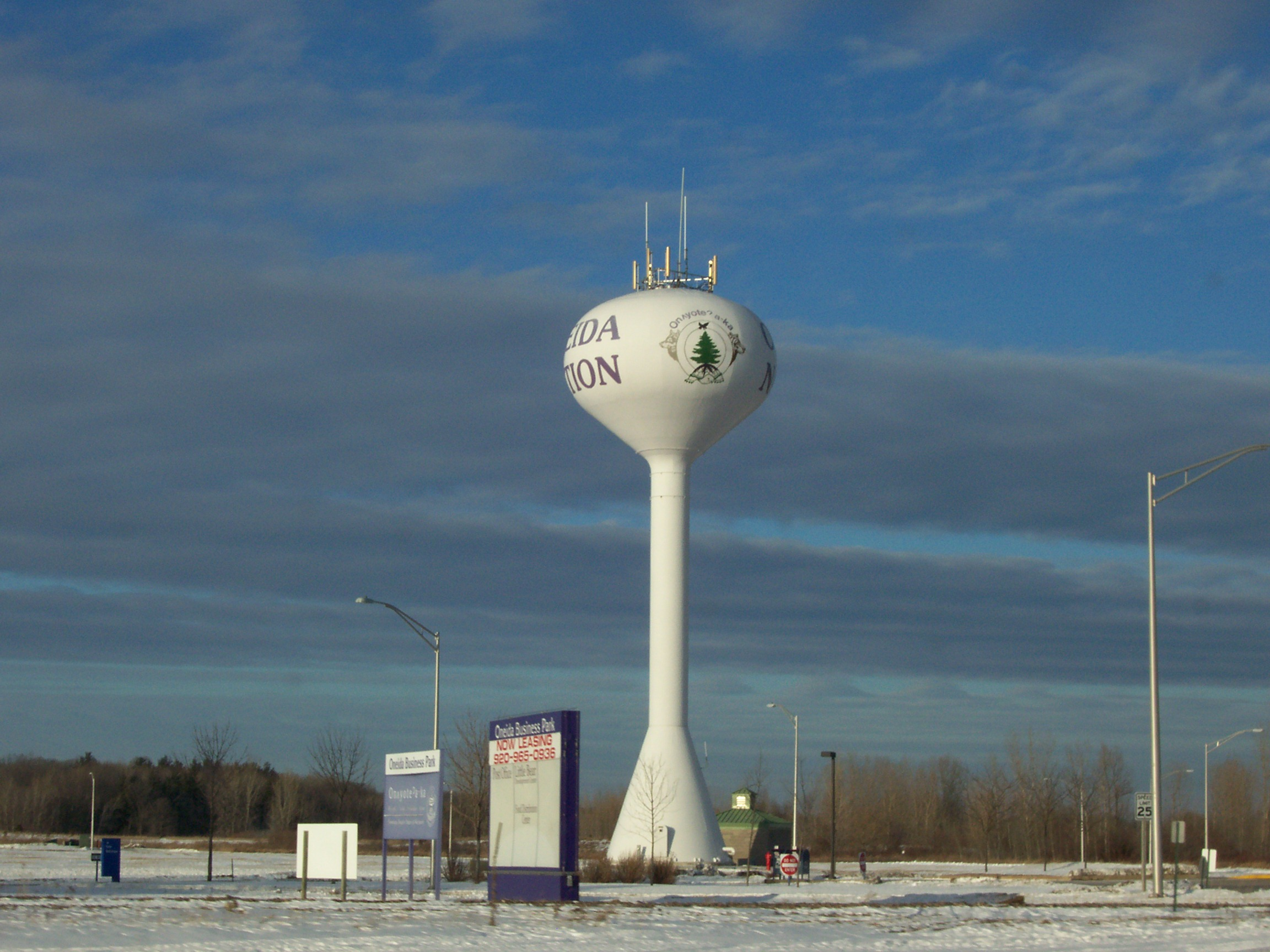
A water tower for the Oneida Nation in Oneida, Wisconsin

The Oneida reorganized their government in the 1930s under the Indian Reorganization Act of 1934. In 1936 they adopted the Oneida Constitution. They have an elected government, with a tribal chairman, a nine-person business committee elected to three-year terms by the full membership of the nation, and the Oneida Tribal Judicial System. Additional committees and commissions are appointed or elected as needed. The tribal chair is Tehassi Hill.

== Controversies ==
=== ICE facility contracts (2025) ===
In December 2025, it was reported that Oneida-Stantec JV LLC, a joint venture under the Oneida Nation's holding company OESC Group, had been awarded contracts totaling approximately $6.4 million to work with U.S. Immigration and Customs Enforcement (ICE). The contracts included a $3,773,406 contract (70CMSW26C00000001) signed December 26, 2025, for engineering services supporting ICE facilities in El Paso, Texas, and a $2,601,211.89 contract (70CMSW25C00000021) signed September 19, 2025, for maintenance of government-owned facilities. The Oneida Business Committee stated they were unaware of the contracts until December 29, 2025. On December 31, 2025, the Business Committee adopted a resolution requiring tribal divisions and corporations to disengage from ICE contracts, with Chairman Tehassi Hill stating the contracts "hinder teaching our values to the next seven generations." The revelation drew criticism from tribal members and Native American advocates, who noted the history of forced relocations of Indigenous peoples, including the Oneida's own removal from New York in the 1820s.

== Membership ==
As a sovereign nation, the people set their rules for membership. They require members to document that they have at least 1/4 Oneida blood (blood quantum). They do not require ancestry through the maternal line, as does the Oneida Indian Nation of New York.

== Economy ==
The Oneida had a rural economy for many years, based on subsistence farming in the 19th century and timber harvesting. During the New Deal, the tribe benefited from employment related to the Works Progress Administration and the Civilian Conservation Corps, which helped build infrastructure for the community.

In the mid to late-1980s the Nation started a bingo game program televised on Green Bay stations. A caller read the numbers on the bottom of the screen, and a lighted number board was shown in the upper part of the screen. Winners could redeem winning cards at the tribe's bingo hall.

In 1988, the Nation sold the first "modern" lottery tickets in the state at their reservation. The state had authorized a state lottery, but it did not begin operations until 1991. The main game offered by the Oneida Nation was Big Green, which began as a pick-6-of-36 jackpot game.

Since that time, the Nation has developed the Ashwaubenon Casino on the reservation for gaming, entertainment, etc. It generates revenues for reinvestment in economic development and welfare. The gaming complex includes related hotel, conference and other facilities. Since developing gaming casinos after 1988, the Oneida tribe has, in a matter of a few decades, gone from being a destitute people to enjoying a fair amount of social prosperity. They have invested a large portion of their profits back into their community, including a sponsorship of the Green Bay Packers.

The issue of Oneida Nation's contributions to the larger community has raised controversy, as has Indian gaming throughout the country. The lottery game Big Green offered on the reservation predates the launch of the statewide Wisconsin Lottery in 1988.

The new wealth generated by the tribe's gaming and other enterprises has enabled the tribe to provide many benefits for its citizens. Oneida members have assistance for dental, medical, and optical insurance and college education. They receive annual per capita payments related to profits from the casino, an amount determined each year.

Many citizens of Green Bay, and many members of the Oneida tribe, have voiced concerns about the potential long-term detrimental effects of relying on casino gaming revenues for the social structure and economy of Green Bay and within the tribe. Similarly, numerous residents have questioned the state's reliance on the Wisconsin Lottery to raise money for state programs. Such systems are considered regressive in terms of tax policy.

In the early 21st century, the Oneida Nation is one of the largest employers in northeastern Wisconsin with over 3,000 employees, including 975 people in tribal government. The Tribe manages more than $16 million in federal and private grant monies, and a wide range of programs, including those authorized by the Indian Self-Determination and Education Assistance Act.

== Notable people ==
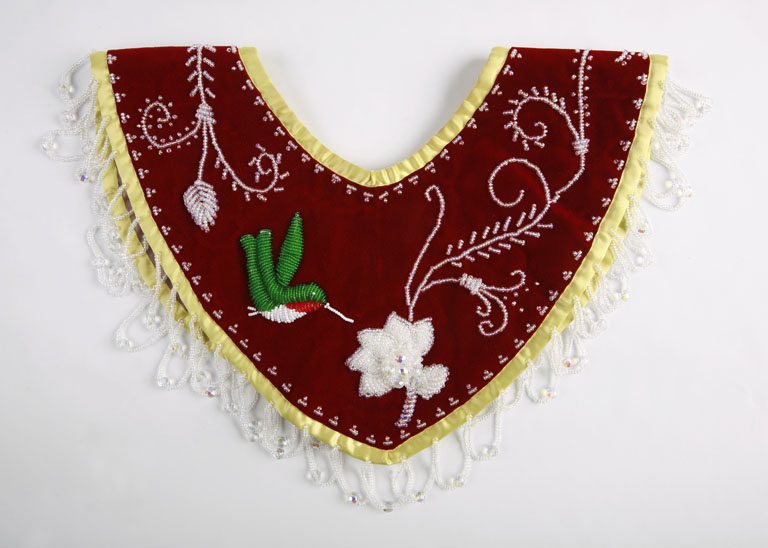
A women's dance and ceremonial collar, made in the Haudenosaunee raised-beadwork style by Karen Ann Hoffman (Oneida Nation), c. 2007, in the collection of The Children's Museum of Indianapolis

- Carl J. Artman (born 1965), Assistant Secretary of the Bureau of Indian Affairs
- Daniel Bread, longtime chief, who helped negotiate the 1838 treaty for reservation and retained common lands for the tribe; in 1870 favored allotment
- Cora Elm (1891–1949), American nurse in France during World War I
- Charlie Hill(1961–2013), comedian, entertainer.
- Laura "Minnie" Cornelius Kellogg (1880-1947), author, orator and activist
- Lillie Rosa Minoka-Hill, Mohawk physician who married an Oneida man in 1905 and treated members of the reservation for decades; she was officially adopted by the Oneida in 1947 to honor her work
- Paul Powless, leader who opposed allotment in the 1870s and helped depose Daniel Bread as a chief at that time
- Purcell Powless, tribal chairman (1967–1990), led during development of gaming casino
- Levi Parker Webster, (1883-1962), athlete
- Martin Wheelock, noted football player at the Carlisle Indian School, 1894–1902.
- Dennison Wheelock, composer, conductor and cornet soloist of the late 19th and early 20th centuries.
- James Riley Wheelock, musician, conductor and clarinet soloist
- Roberta Hill Whiteman, poet and assistant professor of American studies, University of Wisconsin
- Neilson Powless, professional road racing cyclist for EF Education Easypost

== Communities ==
- Ashwaubenon (part, population 907)
- Chicago Corners
- Green Bay (part, population 11,306)
- Hobart (all, population 5,090)
- Howard (part, population 3)
- Oneida

== Points of interest ==
- Austin Straubel International Airport
- Duck Creek Trail

== See also ==
- Oneida people
- Oneida Indian Nation
- Oneida Nation of the Thames
- Six Nations of the Grand River
