= Levi Parker Webster =

American long-distance runner

Levi Webster
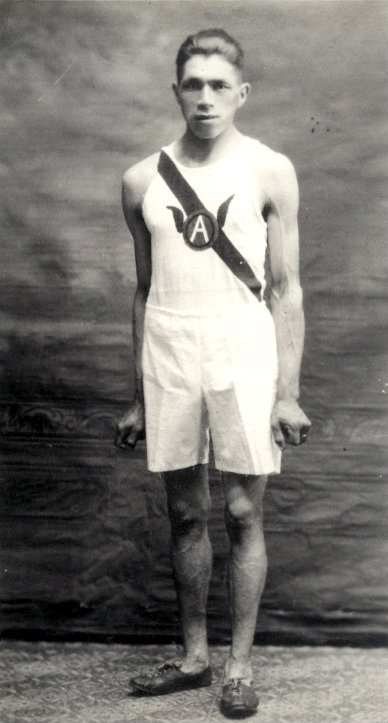
- Portrait of Levi Webster

Personal information
- Full name: Levi Parker Webster
- Born: July 6, 1883
- Died: May 2, 1962 (aged 78)
- Education: Carlisle Indian Industrial School

Levi Parker Webster (aka Chief Tall Feather; July 6, 1883 – May 2, 1962) was an American athlete, professional runner and ultramarathoner. He is known for setting two records for running nearly two decades apart.

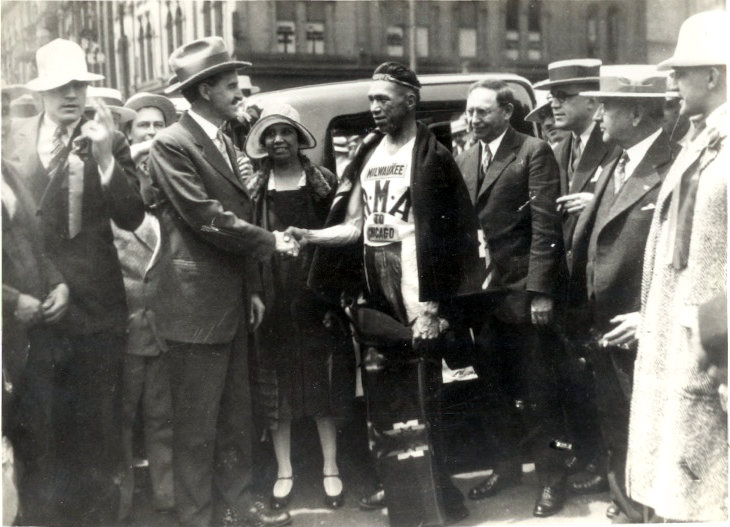
Levi Webster, after breaking the record for the Milwaukee-to-Chicago nonstop marathon.

== Early life ==
Webster was a member of the Oneida Tribe of Indians of Wisconsin and grew up on the Oneida reservation. He was a student at Carlisle Indian Industrial School and received his diploma in 1905.

== Athletic Achievements ==
Webster was a foot racer and played professional football for the Frankford Athletic Club (1906-1908), the Pittsburgh Lyceum (1909-1910) and the Massillon Tigers (1911-1914).

He competed many times against English runner Alfred Shrubb, including a 1908 race in Boston in which Shrubb challenged 5 opponents to run in 2-mile relays against him in a 10-mile race.

In June 1927, Webster broke the record for the Milwaukee-to-Chicago nonstop marathon, 94 miles in 19 hours and 47 minutes. Promoters and the press drew attention to the run as a comeback, citing achievements of nearly twenty years earlier, including a record for the mile run with a time of four minutes, 13 seconds. The sight caused one Time reporter to marvel at the scene: "Arthur Brisbane, Hearst newspaper seer, might have been moved to repeat one of his favorite homilies--'a sight to delight Darwin.' Indian Chief Tall Feather, aged 42, was running along the broad highways from Milwaukee to Chicago. Sleek automobiles swished by him. On his right, electric interurban trains were hissing and steam locomotives were chuffing. On his left, steamers were cutting the waters of Lake Michigan. It was a scene such as every child has seen in the educational "wonder books.""

On his 50th birthday he ran 50 miles from Green Bay to Oshkosh, Wisconsin. For many years his family held an honor run of 50 miles, shared between them, each summer.

== Personal ==
Webster married Servilla Dell Skenandore in 1930 and they had 14 children.
