= Purcell Powless =

Tribal chairman of the Oneida Nation of Wisconsin (1925–2010)

Purcell Powless (December 25, 1925 – November 5, 2010) was the tribal chairman of the Oneida Nation of Wisconsin, United States.

== Early life ==
Purcell Powless was born into the Oneida Nation of Wisconsin in 1925 on their reservation. He served in the United States Merchant Marines during World War II.

== Career ==
After the war, Powless started as a steel worker.

He gradually became more active in tribal politics. In 1967 he was elected Tribal Chairman of the Oneida Nation of Wisconsin, taking over from Norbert Hill. Before that, he served on the nine-member Business Committee. Repeatedly re-elected, he served until 1990.

He led the Nation in new directions, establishing bingo, a lottery in 1988, and a gaming casino as new sources of revenues to provide for economic development and welfare of the tribe. During his administration the Nation developed the Ashwaubenon Casino in association with private parties.(subscription required)
