= Dennison Wheelock =

American lawyer

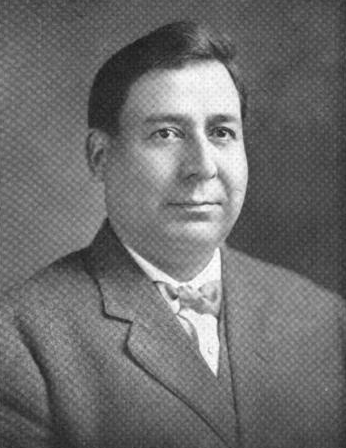
- Dennison Wheelock, c.1914
- Born: June 14, 1871; Oneida Nation of Wisconsin
- Died: March 10, 1927 (aged 55)
- Education: Carlisle Indian School, Dickinson Preparatory School
- Era: Progressive Era
- Known for: Musician, composer, conductor, lawyer, Native American activist
- Children: Richard Edmund Wheelock, Paul Wheelock, Leeland Lloyd Wheelock, Louise Frances Wheelock.
- Parent(s): James A. Wheelock (father); Sophia Doxtator (mother)

Dennison Wheelock (June 14, 1871 – March 10, 1927) was an Oneida band conductor, composer, and cornet soloist. Wheelock was the most prominent Indian American band leader of the turn of the century and was nominated to serve as the bandmaster of the United States Marine Band. At the age of 40 he became an American Indian rights activist and attorney, and within several years was arguing cases for Indian nations at the United States Court of Claims and US Supreme Court.

Wheelock was born in the Oneida Nation of Wisconsin. He went to Pennsylvania to be educated at the Carlisle Indian School, returning later for study at Dickinson Preparatory School. Wheelock was appointed as the first Oneida bandmaster of the internationally acclaimed Carlisle Indian School Band, which performed at world fairs, expositions, and presidential inaugurals. While at the school, he composed the Sousa-inspired "Carlisle Indian School March." In 1900 he debuted his three-part symphony, Aboriginal Suite, at Carnegie Hall in New York City.

In 1911 Wheelock was among the 50 founding members of the Society of American Indians, the first national American Indian rights organization developed and run by American Indians. He had read the law and passed the bar that year, practicing first in Wisconsin. As he represented more Indian nations in his practice, he moved to Washington, D.C., where he represented them in actions against the government in the United States Court of Claims and the U.S. Supreme Court. In 1980, to honor him and the celebrated Carlisle Indian Band, Dennison Wheelock's Bandstand was reconstructed on the site of the original at the U.S. Army War College in Carlisle, Pennsylvania.

== Early life ==
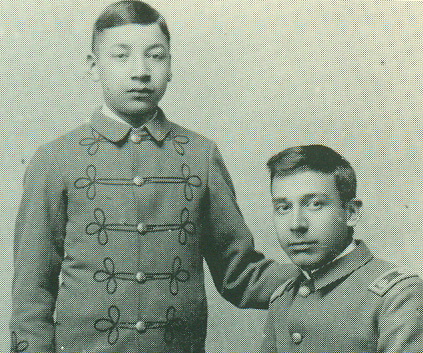
Brothers Dennison and James Wheelock served as bandmasters, Carlisle Indian School, Carlisle, PA, c.1885

Dennison Wheelock was born June 14, 1871, in the Oneida Nation of Wisconsin, second child of James A. Wheelock and Sophia Doxtator. He had an older brother Charles and a total of eight other brothers and sisters, and half-siblings. Dennison grew up impoverished, with the Oneida farm community facing pressures to harvest its timber and a federal push for the allotment of tribal lands to individual households. Dennison followed Charles in playing the cornet. He was impressed by a visiting Tuscarora musician, who taught the youth music reading and simple composition for several months. Dennison also heard the popular band music of John Philip Sousa at Wisconsin fairs. Locally, the Oneida Union Band and the Oneida National Band were prominent in community events and throughout the Midwest.

== Carlisle Indian School ==
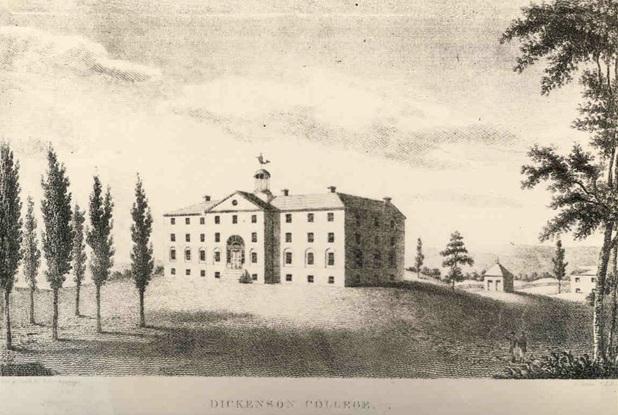
The collaborative effort between Dickinson College and Carlisle Indian School lasted almost four decades, from the opening day to the closing of the school. Old West, Dickinson College, 1810

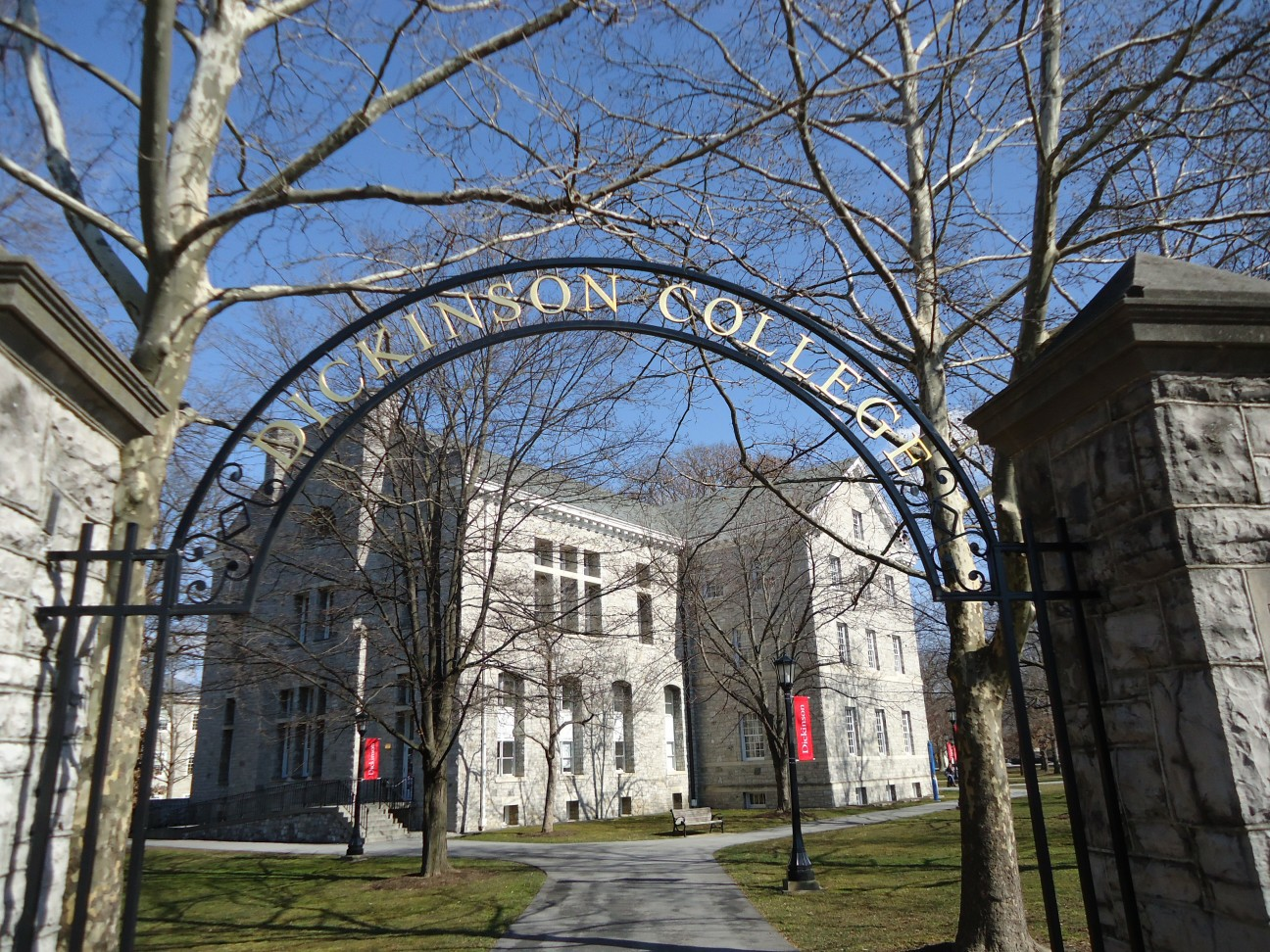
Dickinson College provided Carlisle Indian School students with access to preparatory and college-level education, and Dickinson professors served as chaplains and special faculty to the Indian School.

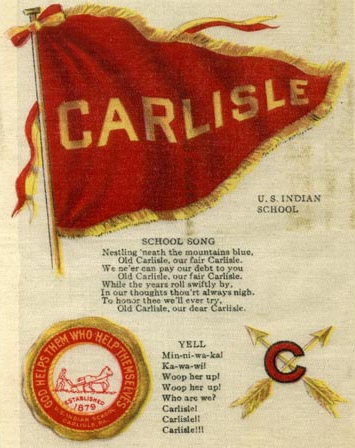

In January 1884 at age 13, Wheelock wrote to Captain Richard Henry Pratt, Superintendent of the Carlisle Indian School, referring to his "limited musical education" and budding interest in music. In 1885, Wheelock enrolled in the Carlisle Indian School to study under Pratt. Hamilton-Oneida Academy, now Hamilton College, was a seminary founded in 1793 by Presbyterian Samuel Kirkland as part of his missionary work with the Oneida in New York State, their traditional territory.

In June 1890, Dennison graduated from Carlisle. He returned to Oneida, Wisconsin, where he worked as a teacher and a justice of the peace, before returning to Carlisle within a year. With Pratt's recommendation, he enrolled in the nearby Dickinson Preparatory School. Dickinson College provided Carlisle Indian students with access to college-level education through the Dickinson Preparatory School ("Conway Hall"). Dennison attended Dickinson Preparatory school from 1891 to 1892. In 1892, Pratt appointed Dennison as Carlisle's bandmaster

== Music at Carlisle ==
During the Progressive Era, from the late 19th century until the onset of World War I, Native American performers were major draws and money-makers. Millions of visitors at world fairs, exhibitions, and parades throughout the United States and Europe saw Native Americans portrayed as the vanishing race, exotic peoples, and objects of modern comparative anthropology. Reformers and Progressives fought a war of words and images against the popular Wild West shows at world fairs, expositions and parades. They opposed theatrical portrayals of Wild Westers as vulgar heathen stereotypes. In contrast, Carlisle students were portrayed as a new generation of Native American leadership embracing civilization, education and industry.

Development of the Carlisle music program was funded mainly by band members and private donations. Around 1879, a visiting philanthropist from Boston reported hearing "tom-toms" and Indian singing in the dormitories. Pratt preferred that the "tom-toms" stopped, but said, "It wouldn't be fair to do unless I can give them something else as good, or better, on the same line. If you will give me a set of brass instruments, I will give them to the "tom-tom boys" and they can toot on them, and this will stop the "tom-tom." The philanthropist subsequently provided the school with brass instruments.

While classical European music was emphasized at Carlisle, the students also sang and drummed traditional tribal music in their dormitories. They played samples of such music at assembly and local community programs. Later, Wheelock featured American Indian music with classical European music in his opera, Aboriginal Suite.

== Carlisle Indian Band ==
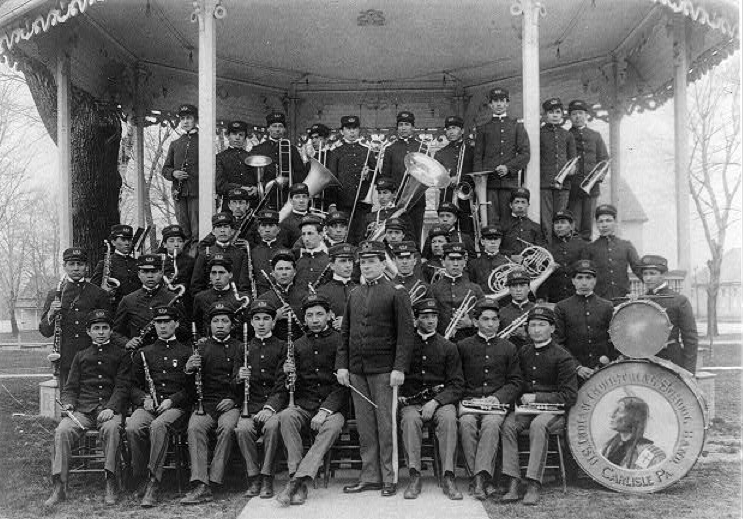
Dennison Wheelock's Bandstand, Carlisle Indian School, Carlisle, PA, 1901

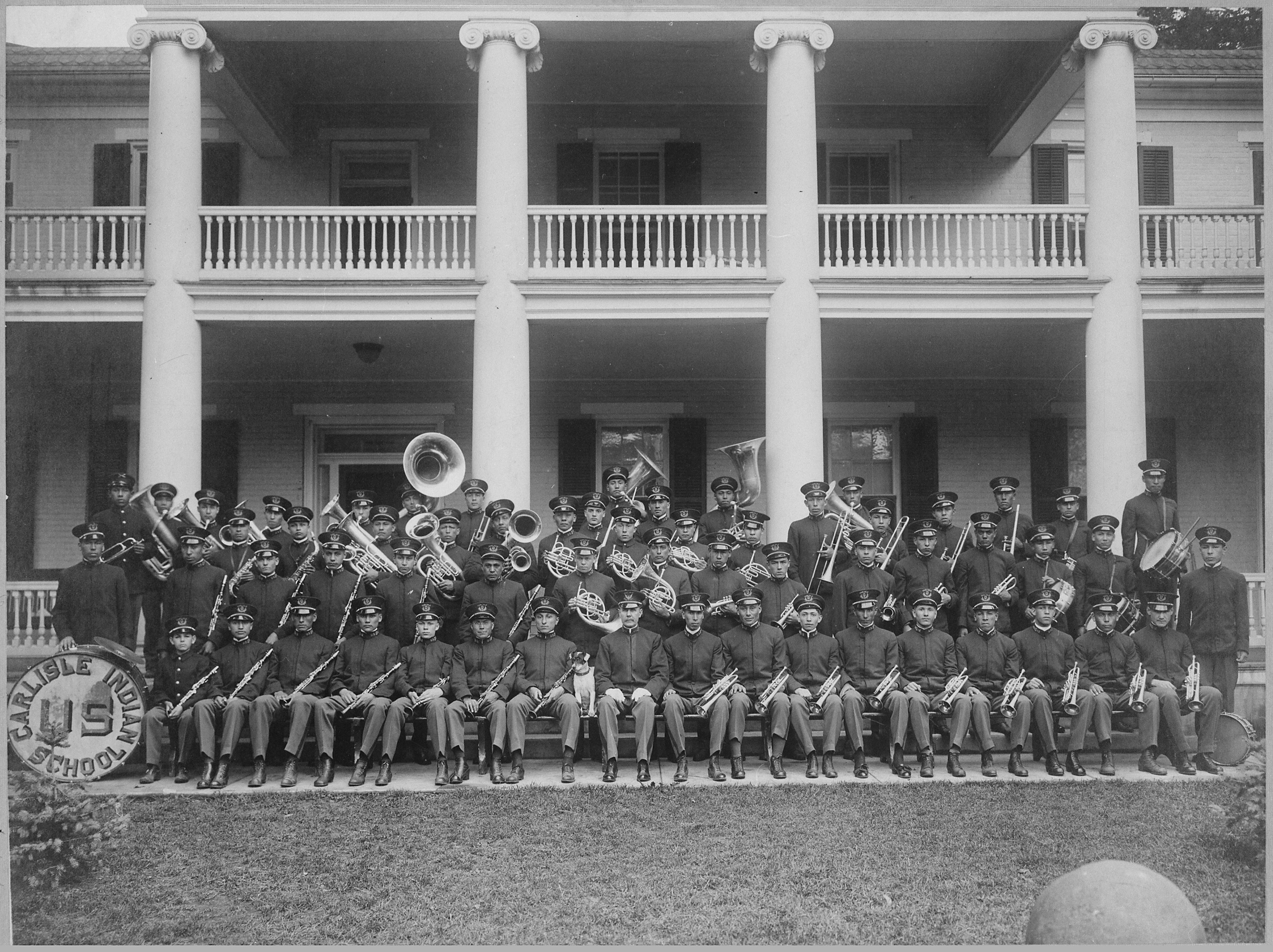
The Carlisle Indian Band performed at world fairs, expositions and every at national presidential inaugural celebration until the school closed. Carlisle, PA, 1915

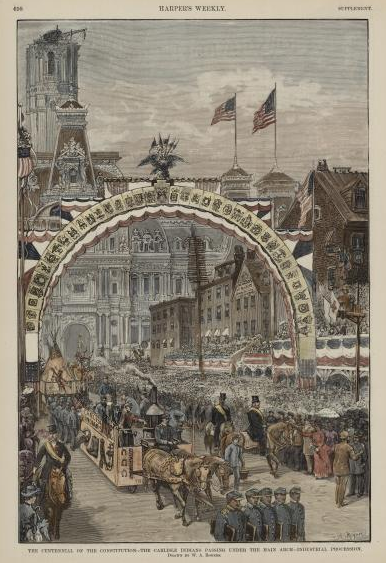
Carlisle Indian Students at the Centennial of the Constitution Parade, Philadelphia, PA, 1887

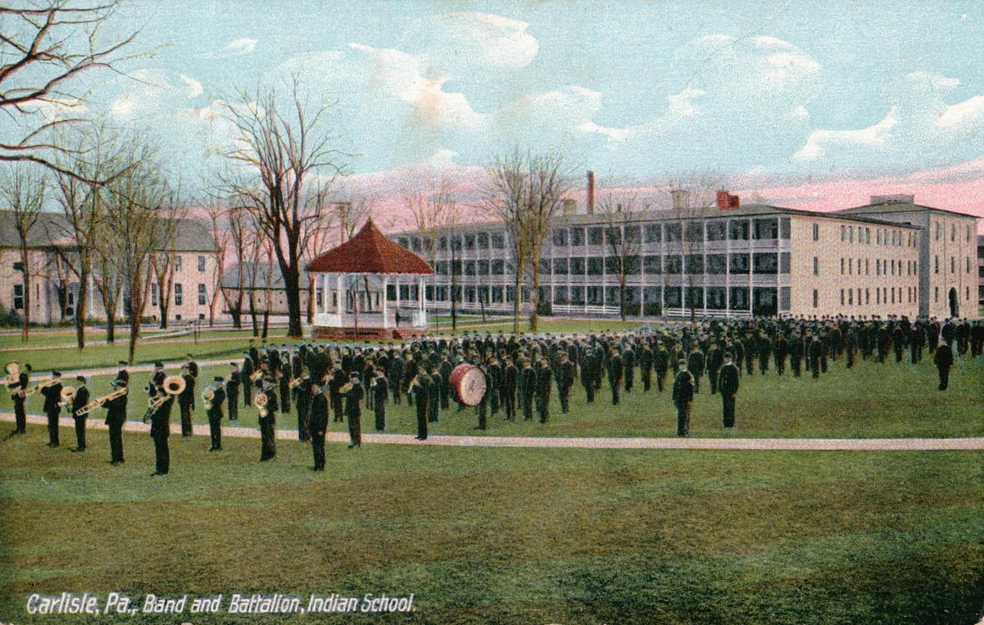
The Carlisle Indian Band earned an international reputation. Carlisle Indian School Band and Battalion. Carlisle, PA, c. 1911

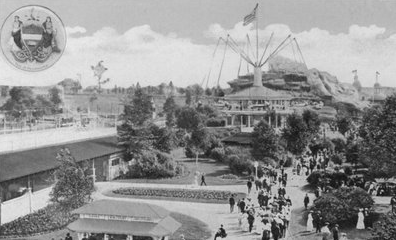
Wheelock drew 70,000 people to a concert at Willow Grove Park, Pennsylvania, and was awarded a gold medal and a silver cup for his brilliant conducting.

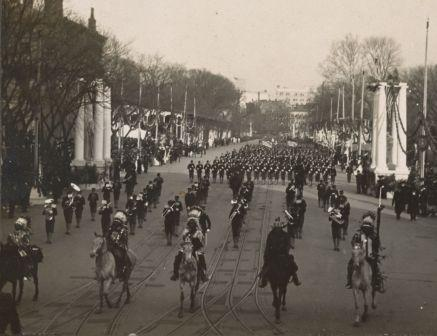
First Inaugural Parade of Theodore Roosevelt, March 4, 1905. President Roosevelt waved his hat and members of the President's box rose to their feet to see the six famous Native American chiefs in full regalia on horseback, followed by the 46-piece Carlisle Indian School Band and a brigade of 350 Carlisle Cadets.

Pratt established the Carlisle Indian School band in 1880. Dennison was the first American Indian bandmaster at Carlisle before being succeeded by his brother James. Under the leadership of Dennison Wheelock and James Wheelock, the Carlisle Indian Band earned an international reputation of musical excellence. The Carlisle Indian Band performed at world fairs, expositions, concert venues and at every national presidential inaugural celebration until the school closed. During this period, Dennison continued to create compositions outside of the band, including a symphony.

== Marriage ==
Louise LaChapelle (Wheelock), a Chippewa from the White Earth Reservation in northwestern Minnesota, arrived as a student at Carlisle two years earlier than Dennison.

They met, courted, married and had four children. Richard Edmund Wheelock, Paul Wheelock, Leeland Lloyd Wheelock, and Louise Frances Wheelock. Their first two children were born in Carlisle.

== Captain Richard Henry Pratt ==
Captain Pratt was Dennison's mentor and school father. Further, Carlisle, Pennsylvania was Dennison's second home. Wheelock corresponded with Pratt for over 35 years and confided in each other throughout their lives. Wheelock had affection for Pratt, his wife and Carlisle. Wheelock shared Pratt's views. They focused upon the release of Indians from federal control, full citizenship, equal opportunity and education in public schools. From 1921 to 1922, Captain Pratt lobbied President Warren G. Harding to nominate Wheelock as the Commissioner of Indian Affairs.

== James Riley Wheelock ==
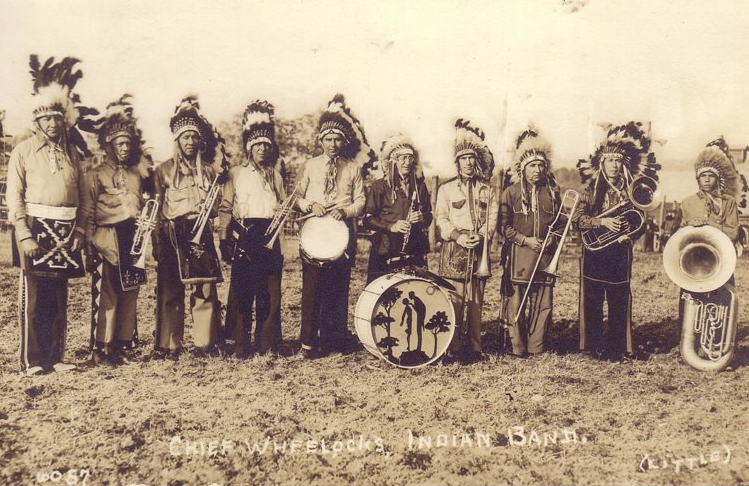
Chief James Wheelock's Band

Under the leadership of Dennison Wheelock and James Wheelock, the Carlisle Indian Band earned an international reputation of musical excellence. James Riley Wheelock was a younger brother of bandmaster Dennison Wheelock and graduated from Carlisle in 1896. Like Dennis, James attended the prestigious Dickinson College Preparatory School after completing his Carlisle studies. When Dennison resigned as Bandmaster in 1900, James succeeded him. In 1903, James studied music and his specialty, clarinet, in Leipzig, Germany.

In 1914, the Harrisburg Telegraph reported that James Riley Wheelock, director of the Enola Band, was performing in clarinet solos and was one of the best clarinet players in Pennsylvania. During World War I, Wheelock was commissioned as a Second Lieutenant in the U.S. Army, where he conducted a black regimental band. After the war, he conducted the U.S. Indian Band through the 1920s.

== International fame ==
=== Carlisle Indian Band ===
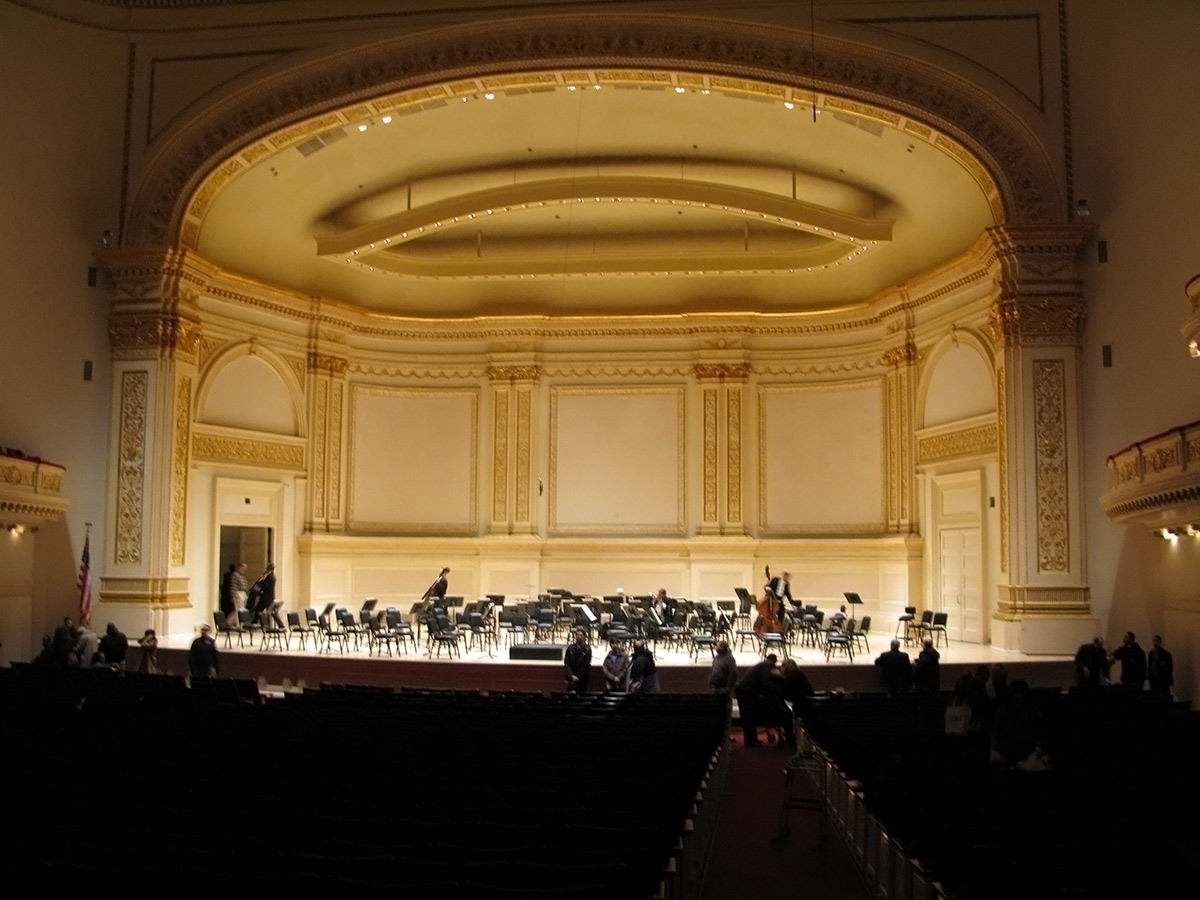
On March 28, 1900, Wheelock and the US Indian Band performed at Carnegie Hall and debuted his three part symphony titled "Aboriginal Suite." Carnegie Hall, New York City

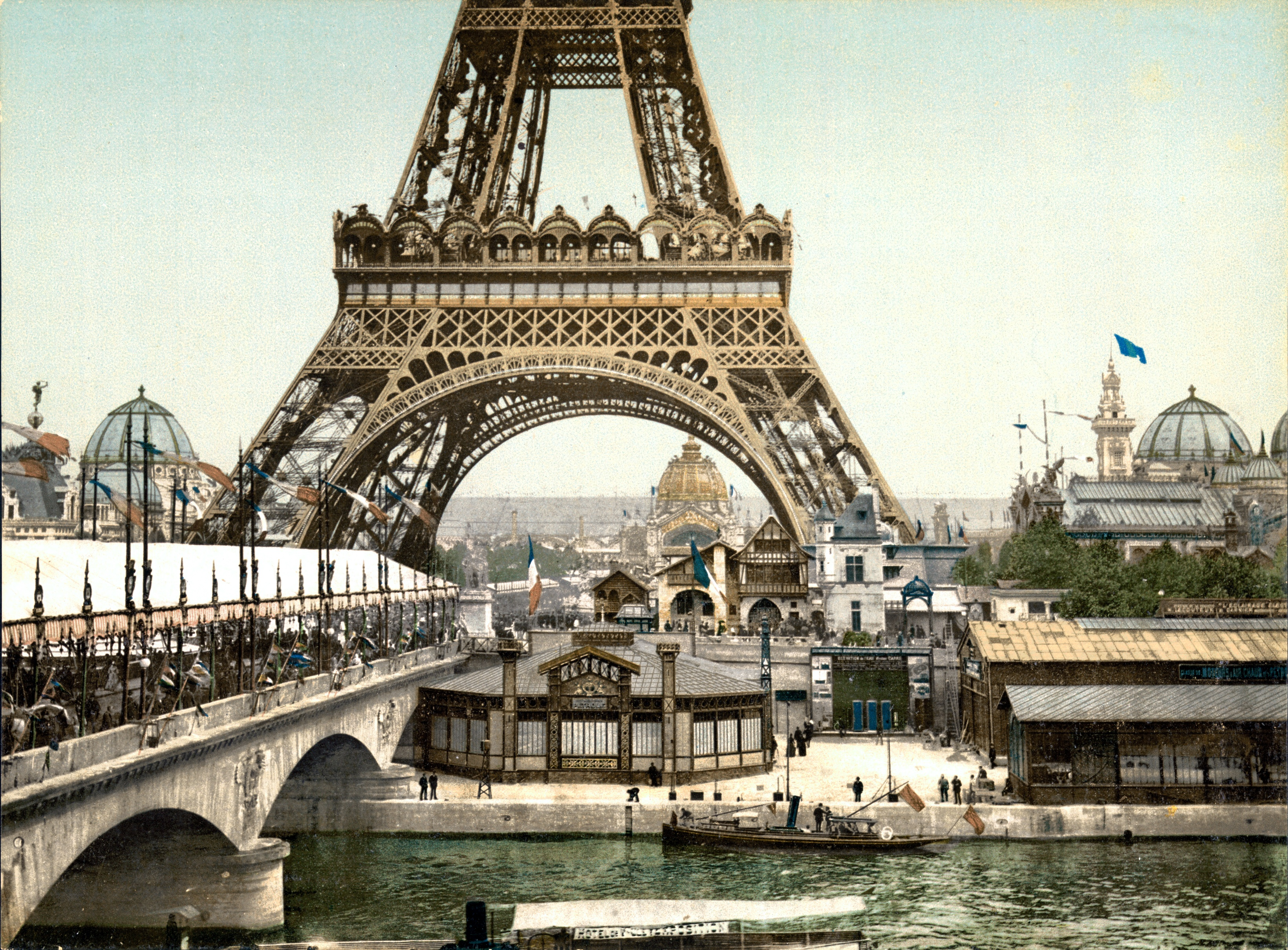
In 1900, the Republican Guard Band of France played the Aboriginal Suite in tribute to Wheelock in absence of the Carlisle Indian Band at the Paris Exposition.

Inspired by the works of John Philip Sousa, Wheelock was frequently compared to him. Wheelock was later nominated to succeed Sousa as the bandmaster of United States Marine Band. Wheelock relished Sousa's music, known for American march music.

=== The Aboriginal Suite ===
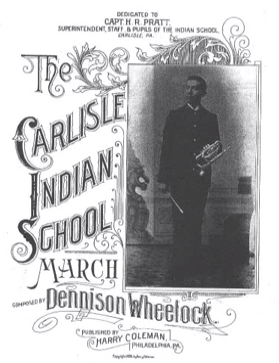
Carlisle Indian School March, 1896

In 1897, Wheelock recruited 70 students from Indian boarding schools from around the country to form an all-Indian student band. With the group, Wheelock planned to perform a symphony he had written, Aboriginal Suite, at the Paris Exposition of 1900 and the Pan-American Exposition of 1901 in Buffalo, New York. Wheelock was thought to be influenced by the music of European composer Edvard Grieg.

On March 28, 1900, Wheelock and the U.S. Indian Band performed his Aboriginal Suite at Carnegie Hall, a prestigious venue in New York City. The band additionally performed portions of Gounod's opera Faust (opera) and Meyerbeer's The Huguenots. The concert was acclaimed by theatregoers: "A large and genuinely enthusiastic audience greeted the reservation musicians, forcing them to respond to repeated encores."

Wheelock said in an interview,

The original Indian music is a strange thing. It is devoid of harmony, but the melody and time are there, and it is easily harmonized. Some great critics say that our aboriginal music is the same as played by all primitive people world over. Chinese music itself is built on the same principle and I am planning out the composition called the evolution of music. I hope to show the growth of harmony. First, so many musicians will come out in Indian costume, play some primitive melody. Others will follow playing something more advanced, and so on until the whole band is on stage and we are rendering the best grand opera.

Six weeks later, Wheelock's 10-month-old son Paul died. Pratt canceled the band's appearance in Paris, while the National Band of France performed Aboriginal Suite in tribute.

=== Haskell Indian School ===
In 1900, after his son died at Carlisle, Wheelock resigned his post and looked for a different job. He worked as a newspaperman in Green Bay, Wisconsin and the U.S. Indian School at Flandreau, South Dakota. Wheelock performed as guest bandmaster at Willow Grove Park, near Philadelphia, Pennsylvania. This premier venue featured Sousa and his band at the music pavilion every year but one between 1901 and 1926. 70,000 people attended one of Wheelock's performances, and his conducting skills earned him a gold medal and silver cup.

In 1903, Wheelock was appointed bandmaster of Haskell Indian School in Lawrence, Kansas, and his performances nationally acclaimed. In March 1904, a review in Metronome called the band an "up-to-date aggregation of capable musicians trained in every respect for high-class concert work." "Besides performing "their own quaint Indian songs they played Gounod, Mendelssohn, Mozart and Wagner".

In 1904, Wheelock's Haskell Indian Band performed at the Louisiana Purchase Exposition, known as the St. Louis World's Fair. They also performed at the Pennsylvania state pavilion. That year, Wheelock faced financial struggles in attempts to support his own family. Pratt had been removed from his position at Carlisle by BIA officials and was unable to assist Wheelock, leading to his resignation from Haskell to find a better paying job.

== Society of American Indians ==
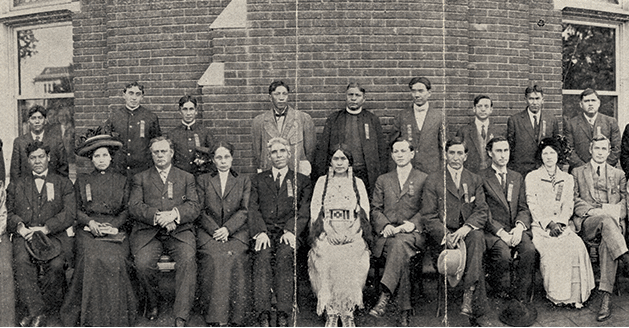
The first conference of the Society of American Indians, Ohio State University, Columbus, Ohio, 1911

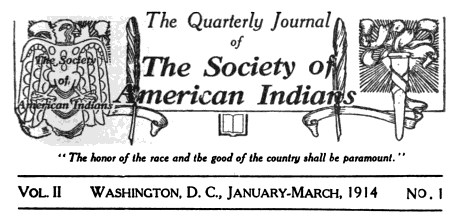
Wheelock was among 50 founders of the Society of American Indians, the first national American Indian rights organization developed and run by American Indians.

Wheelock was among the 50 founders in 1911 of the Society of American Indians (1911-1923). The Society of American Indians was the forerunner of modern organizations such as the National Congress of American Indians.

In October 1914, Wheelock hosted the society's 1914 annual convention in Madison, Wisconsin. In December 1914, the society met in Washington, D.C., where its members received a first-class reception from the federal government. Commissioner of Indian Affairs Cato Sells welcomed them to the nation's capital, where they toured the Bureau of Indian Affairs. He arranged for a visit to the White House to meet with President Woodrow Wilson.

Wheelock presented the president with the society's petition for a three-member commission to gain US citizenship for American Indians, and for broadening jurisdiction of the U.S. Court of Claims to all Indian nation claims against America. He said to Wilson, "We believe that you feel, with the progressive members of your race, that it is anomalous permanently to conserve within the nation groups of people whose civic condition by legislation is different from the normal standard of American life." The outbreak of World War I impeded federal enactment of remedial Indian legislation.

== Law career ==
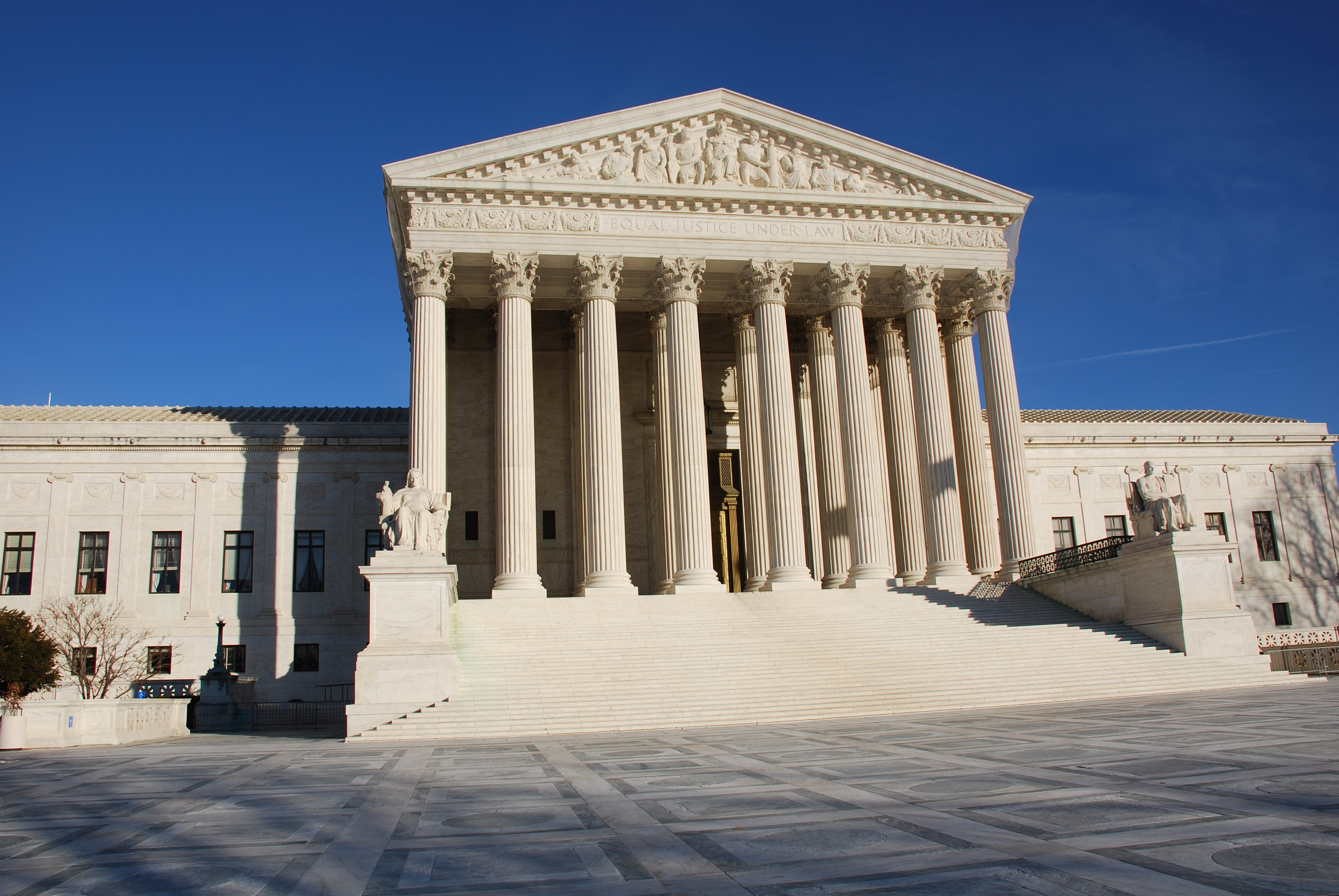
Wheelock represented Native American tribal nations before the US Court of Claims and the US Supreme Court.

In 1910, Wheelock decided to go into law. He took up the study of law by returning to Carlisle, Pennsylvania, where he had a wide professional network. He "reading the law" as an apprentice at the office of John Miller, head of the Cumberland County Bar Association. He served as a legal apprentice to Miller.

In 1911, after completing his training, Wheelock returned to Wisconsin and completed requirements to be admitted to the Bar. He established his residence and practice in De Pere, near the Oneida Nation of Wisconsin. Wheelock became a successful attorney, representing clients of all races in Wisconsin. Dennison returned to leading concerts in 1915 with the Green Bay Concert Band, of which he was one of the few Indian members.

During the next decade, Wheelock expanded his practice well beyond Wisconsin. By 1923, he was specializing in representing tribal nations, ranging across the country from those in Washington State to New York, including the Nisqually, Menominee, Mohawk, and Stockbridge-Munsee Band. As he was increasingly representing these nations in claims and actions related to the federal government, he moved his law practice to Washington, D.C. There he argued appellate cases before the US Supreme Court and the US Court of Claims.

== Later years ==
In 1921, Wheelock managed and acted as bandmaster at the Oneida Indian Centennial Celebration, a 100th anniversary celebration of the tribe's migration to Wisconsin. The band performed Bizet's Carmen and other classics. A special grandstand was used for Indians to perform and celebrate Menominee and Oneida music and dancing.

Wheelock continued his practice in Washington, DC until his death on March 10, 1927, at the age of 56. He was buried in a Masonic funeral at Woodlawn Cemetery, Brown County, Wisconsin. His wife Louise LaChapelle Wheelock died on January 16, 1931. She was buried next to him.

== Legacy and honors ==
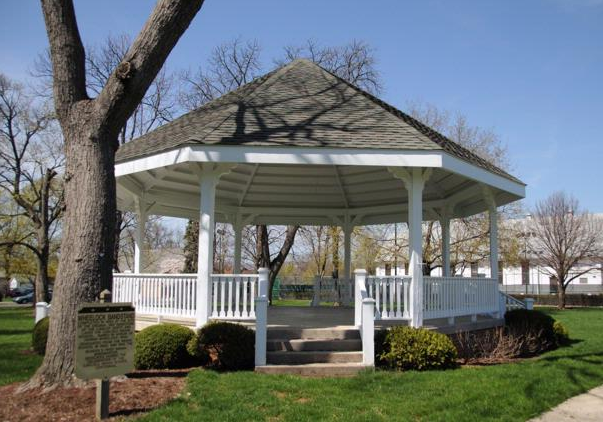
Dennison Wheelock's Bandstand, U.S. Army War College, Carlisle, Pennsylvania

- In 1980, Dennison Wheelock's Bandstand was reconstructed on the site of the original at the U.S. Army War College, Carlisle, Pennsylvania. The Carlisle Barracks complex was designated a National Historic Landmark (NHL) in 1961 because of its significant history and many uses.
- On August 14, 2003, the Green Bay Concert Band played Wheelock's Aboriginal Suite at the Oneida Nation of Wisconsin. The symphony had not been performed in more than 75 years.

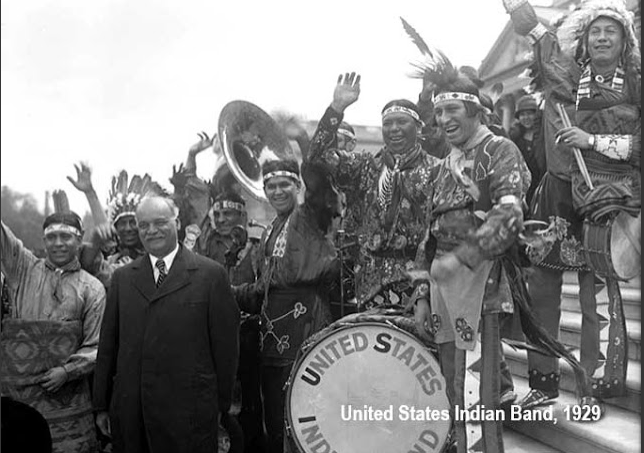
U.S. Indian Band serenades U.S. Vice President Charles Curtis, Washington, D.C., 1929
