= Paul Powless =

- Tegahsweangalolis

Oneida leader

Personal details
- Children: Henry
- Known for: Fought in the Battle of Oriskany

Paul Powless or Tegahsweangalolis ("Saw Mill") (c. 1758 – 1847) was a warrior and chief of the Oneida people and hereditary Royaner (sachem) of the Bear clan. Like many of his people, he joined the American side during the Revolutionary War and served as a spy and messenger.

== Encounter with Joseph Brant ==
During the Siege of Fort Stanwix, the about 17-year-old Powless came upon Mohawk leader Joseph Brant, who was allied with the British forces of the St. Leger Expedition. Brant tried to convince the Oneida to surrender.

Brant insinuatingly offered him a large reward, and a plenty as long as he should live, if he would only join the King’s side, and induce other Oneidas to do so, and help the British to take Fort Stanwix. Powless firmly rejected any such blandishments, saying he and his brother Oneidas had joined their fortunes with those of the Americans and should share with them whatever good or ill might come. Brant portrayed the great and resistless power of the King, and profess[ed] to deplore the ruin of the Oneidas if they should foolishly and recklessly persist in their determination. Powless replied that he and the Oneidas would persevere, if need be, till all were annihilated; and that was all he had to say, when each retired his own way.

The two parted without conflict and Powless continued to Fort Stanwix, sneaking into the besieged fort before carrying word to Schenectady on horseback. They later fought on opposing sides during the Battle of Orsikany.
