= Sherman Coolidge =

Canon Sherman Coolidge
- Doa-che-wa-a (Runs-on-Top)
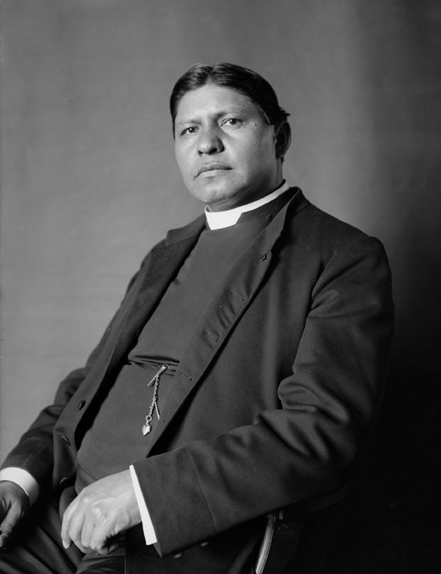
- Sherman Coolidge was a founder and leader of the Society of American Indians (1911-1923), the first national American Indian rights organization run by and for American Indians
- Born: February 22, 1862; Near present-day Sheridan, Wyoming
- Died: January 24, 1932 (aged 69); Los Angeles, California
- Burial place: Evergreen Cemetery (Colorado Springs, Colorado)
- Education: Seabury Divinity School; Hobart College
- Occupations: Clergy, missionary
- Spouse: Grace Wetherbee Coolidge
- Church: Episcopal Church
- Ordained: 1884

Sherman Coolidge (February 22, 1862 – January 24, 1932), an Episcopal Church priest and educator, helped found and lead the Society of American Indians (1911–1923). That first national American Indian rights organization run by and for Native Americans pioneered twentieth-century Pan-Indianism, the philosophy and movement promoting unity among American Indians regardless of tribal affiliation.

Coolidge spent twenty-six years preaching and teaching Shoshone and Arapaho people at the Wind River Reservation at Fort Washakie, Wyoming. He traveled throughout United States lecturing on behalf of Native Americans. In 1923, Coolidge served on President Calvin Coolidge's "Committee of One Hundred" to review and advise on American Indian policy. In the 1920s, Coolidge was transferred to Colorado where he served as Canon at the Cathedral of St. John in the Wilderness in Denver, Colorado, and in Colorado Springs, Colorado.

== Early life ==
On February 22, 1862, Coolidge was born near present-day Sheridan, Wyoming. His family was camped near the upper waters of the Bighorn River. Banasda (Big Heart) and Ba-ahnoce (Turtle Woman), both Arapaho, gave their newborn son the name Doa-che-wa-a (Runs-on-Top). They moved with the seasons to hunting grounds and to places where they gathered food, while in competition with Eastern Shoshone for the resources.

When Coolidge was a young boy, Shoshone warriors attacked the camp that he lived in. They came in the middle of the night and slaughtered the Arapaho until they resisted the fight. Another tragedy occurred when American soldiers mistook the Arapaho for Lakota, which resulted in the death of his aunt, uncle, and grandmother.

In the spring of 1867, Coolidge and his family were camped by a stream. They were awakened by war cries. While his family ran for safety, Banasda stayed to fight the attackers and was shot through the chest and was killed.

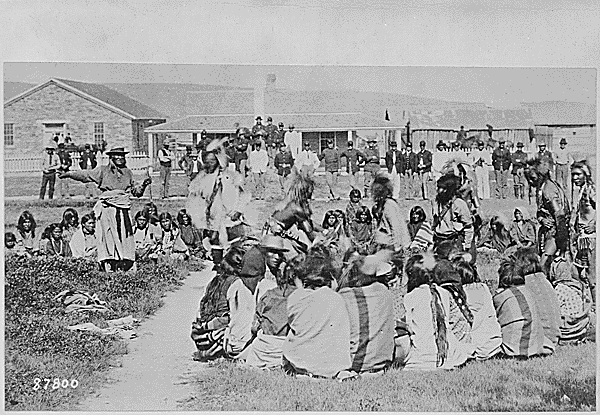
Shoshone Indians at Fort Washakie, Wyoming. Some of the Shoshones are dancing as the soldiers look on. This is the last photograph of Chief Washakie, who is on the extreme left, standing and pointing.

As pioneers traveled through Wyoming on the Oregon Trail and Bozeman Trail, there were escalating violence between the military and Native Americans of the Great Plains—Arapaho, Cheyenne, and Lakota. The Treaty of Fort Laramie (1868) created the Great Sioux Reservation in Dakota Territory. The Northern Arapaho, left without their own land, settled with the Lakota or with the Southern Arapaho.

Coolidge was among a group of Arapaho that were camped along the Popo Agie stream, about two miles from Camp Brown (now Lander, Wyoming). It was the spring of 1870, when men were away on their winter's hunt, leaving women, children, and old men at the camp. In 1870, a white mob attacked Arapaho at Camp Brown (now Fort Washakie). They were aided by the Shoshone and Bannocks, who captured Coolidge. (Note: Van Orsdale states in 1893 that it was a group of Native Americans from Missouri who attacked the camp.) He was nearly executed and he saw an elderly man brutally killed as he begged for his life. Coolidge went to Camp Brown where he was cared for by the camp surgeon, Dr. Shapleigh, and two army officers. (Note: There are differing accounts that his mother knowingly gave her son to the Army so that he would be spared any further attacks... or whether Coolidge was separated from his mother during the commotion of the attacks, and then came to be cared for by the surgeon and officers.) He had two younger brothers who were also taken to Army officers.

== Adoption and education ==
Lieutenant Charles A. Coolidge, 1875 (Note: Lt. Charles A. Coolidge, continued to serve in the military for nearly 50 years. On August 9, 1877, Lieutenant Coolidge was wounded at the Battle of the Big Hole against the Nez Perce, but eventually rose to the rank of Brigadier General by 1903. He died on June 1, 1926, in Detroit, Michigan (at age 81), and was interred at Arlington National Cemetery. His wife, Sophie, died on January 26, 1934, in Washington, D.C.)

Dr. Shapleigh, the boy's guardian, took in the boys, who were heartbroken to be separated from their mother. He-Runs-on-Top was renamed William Tecumseh Sherman after the Union Army general. The 7th U.S. Infantry, which had been based in Utah, traveled through Camp Brown. Lt. Charles A. Coolidge, and his wife, Sofie, adopted "Sherman" and brought to New York City. He attended a segregated school for African American children. He was baptized at the Grace Episcopal Church in lower Manhattan by Rev. Horatio Potter. His adoptive parents treated him like a member of their family and stressed their viewpoints about religion and patriotism.

The Coolidges lived in New York until 1873 when Charles Coolidge was assigned to the Montana Territory. They were posted in a northern part of the territory at Fort Shaw. Coolidge attended the post school.

In 1876, Lt. Col. George Armstrong Custer was killed during the Battle of Little Big Horn against the Lakota. Charles Coolidge's unit buried the dead. His adoptive father had hoped that Coolidge would take on a military career and brought him along on expeditions against the Lakota. His experiences during the Great Sioux War convinced Coolidge that he did not want to become a soldier. He studied at the Shattuck-Saint Mary's, an Episcopalian-run institution, in Faribault, Minnesota from 1877 to 1880.

Upon the advice of Henry Benjamin Whipple, he enrolled in the Seabury Divinity School. He graduated in 1884 with a Bachelor of Divinity degree. Bishop Whipple ordained him to the diaconate in 1884. On May 25, 1885, Bishop John Franklin Spalding of the Colorado Diocese ordained him a priest.

Both Shattuck-Saint Mary's and the divinity school were founded by Bishop Whipple in Faribault. He completed his post-graduate studies at Hobart College, Geneva, New York between 1887 and 1890, with the assistance of President Eliphalet Potter.

== Career ==
=== Missionary and ministry ===
==== Wyoming ====
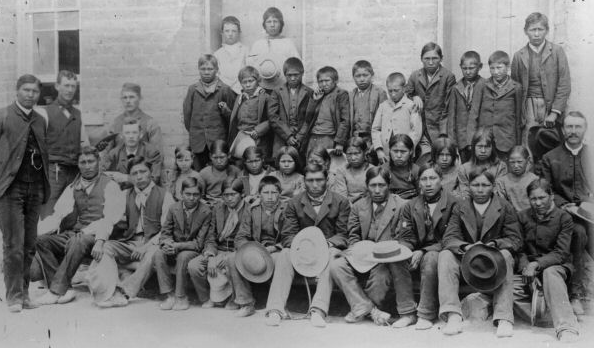
Rev. Coolidge at Wind River School, Fort Washakie, Wyoming

Coolidge traveled west by stagecoach to Wyoming after he graduated from Seabury Divinity School. Called "Arapaho Whiteman", Coolidge reunited with his mother Ba-ahnoce at Wind River Reservation in the fall of 1884,;she had learned of his impending return. Over the past fifteen years since he was separated from his mother, his people had a difficult time finding a place to live and a means to preserve their culture. Under the "restrictive control" of the Indian Bureau. The Northern Arapaho needed to make peace with the Eastern Shoshone at Wind River to survive. Since Ba-ahnoce was parted from her sons, she was subject to near starvation, raids and war. When Coolidge arrived at the reservation, he was met by his mothers and other relatives, including Chief Sharp Nose, who was his uncle.

The Bureau of Indian Affairs had assigned the Episcopal Church eight Indian agencies: seven in Dakota Territory, and the Wind River Indian Agency in Wyoming. On October 2, 1884, Deacon Coolidge began assisting to Episcopalian priest John Roberts at the St. Michael's Mission and government school at Ethete, Wyoming for the Shoshones.

Soon after he entered the priesthood in 1885, Rev. Coolidge traveled to the Wind River Reservation where Shoshones and Arapahos attempted to coexist on opposite ends of the reservation. Besides his primary role of priest and missionary, he was also a mediator, government clerk and a school teacher. It was the start of a 26-year career in Wyoming and Indiana, in which Coolidge and Grace worked together. They had progressive ideas and worked hard to convert people to Christianity, which was off-putting to some.

To survive westward expansion, the Arapaho had to give up their hunting and gathering lifestyle and adopt the lifestyle that left them in poverty, hunger, and starvation. They were no longer able to range to their former hunting grounds. Instead, the United States government expected them to take up farming, which was difficult due to the poor soil on the reservation. They were treated like wards of the government, given rations to keep from starving. They would lose the rations and would possibly be imprisoned if they did not comply with governmental policy. Arapaho and Shoshone children were educated at the two Episcopal and St. Stephens Catholic schools on the reservation.

The Bureau of American Ethnology assigned James Mooney, an anthropologist, to study the nature of the Ghost Dance, which he did with Coolidge’s assistance as an interpreter or as a source of information.

In February 1907, a group of Arapaho protested against the ban of their annual Sun Dance, a social and religious ritual, that had been banned by the Indian Bureau. The Arapaho were bitter towards the agency, as well as the presence of missionaries in their lives. John Robert was returning from a trip to Lander, Wyoming when a group of Arapaho began to pursue him near the border of the reservation. They intended to kill him. He made it back to safety in Lander and called in troops from Fort Washakie. Coolidge returned to the reservation immediately when he heard the news. He was away in Salt Lake City. His intention was to calm the situation.

==== Oklahoma and Minnesota ====
He was transferred to the Episcopal mission at the Cheyenne and Arapaho Indian Reservation in Oklahoma. He was assigned to guide 200 people to give up "old-time customs" and convert them to Christianity. The family was very unhappy there and Coolidge was discouraged with the role of a missionary. He was assigned to minister to white and Dakota people at the Episcopal Church in Faribault, Minnesota in the spring of 1912.

==== Colorado ====
In 1919, Coolidge moved to Colorado, where he served as Canon at the Cathedral of St. John in the Wilderness in Denver. He co-founded the American Indian Film Company to promote hiring Native Americans in the movie industry. In 1923, he moved with his wife and two children to Colorado Springs. He was the rector at the Good Shepherd church.

=== Society of American Indians ===
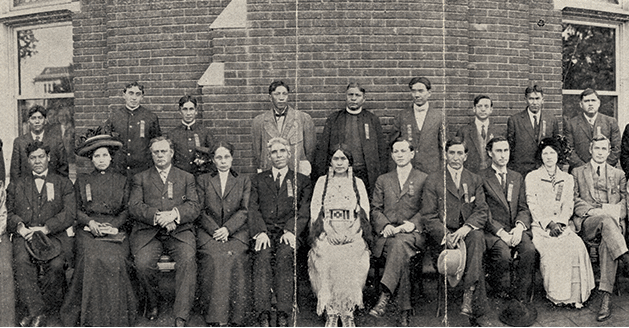
First conference of the Society of American Indians, Ohio State University, Columbus, Ohio, 1911. Coolidge center.

Coolidge and Dr. Charles Eastman founded and led the Society of American Indians (1911-1923), the first national American Indian rights organization developed and run by American Indians. Of all the Society leaders, Coolidge's association with the Society was the longest. The society pioneered twentieth-century Pan-Indianism, the philosophy and movement promoting unity among American Indians regardless of tribal affiliation.

Believing in the strength of numbers, Coolidge believed that Native Americans must "stand solid and united", curb "clannish spirit", and end intertribal rivalries. He said to a group of Native Americans, "I have heard friends of mine say I was educated because... the Arapaho... had a quicker intellect than the Sioux and the Chippewa who were educated in the same schools. I believe that there are many Chippewas, many Sioux, just as smart as I am!" The delegates from different tribes laughed at the barb aimed at intertribal rivalries.

The Society was a forum for a new generation of American Indian leaders known as Red Progressives who shared the enthusiasm and faith of white reformers in the inevitability of progress through education and governmental action. They included prominent people from a number of backgrounds, including clergy, activists, professionals, writers, entertainers, and speakers. Some were political allies and some were staunch critics.

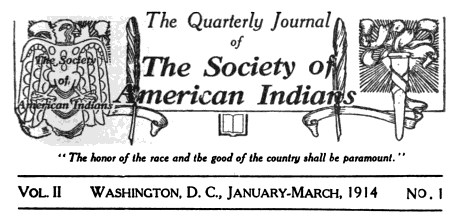
The Society of American Indians was the first national American Indian rights organization run by and for American Indians. Arthur C. Parker was the editor-general. Coolidge, John M. Oskison, Carlos Montezuma, Howard Gansworth, and Henry Roe Cloud were contributing editors.

The Society met at academic institutions, maintained a Washington headquarters, conducted annual conferences, and published a quarterly journal of American Indian literature by American Indian authors. Among the first proponents of an "American Indian Day", it also fought for Native American citizenship as well as opening the U.S. Court of Claims to all tribes and bands in the United States. A forerunner of modern organizations such as the National Congress of American Indians, the Society anticipated by decades important Indian reforms: a major reorganization of the Indian school system in the late 1920s, the codification of Indian law in the 1930s, and the opening of the U.S. Court of Claims to Indians in the 1940s.

At the 1915 annual Congress of the American Indian Association, he issued a declaration calling for the second Saturday of May to be known as "American Indian Day".

=== Committee of One Hundred ===
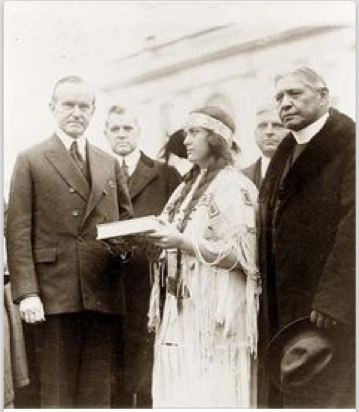
President Calvin Coolidge presented with a book written by G. E. E. Linquist titled "The Red Man In The United States" (1919). Ruth Muskrat Bronson (center) making the presentation on behalf of the "Committee of One Hundred" with Coolidge (right), December, 1923.

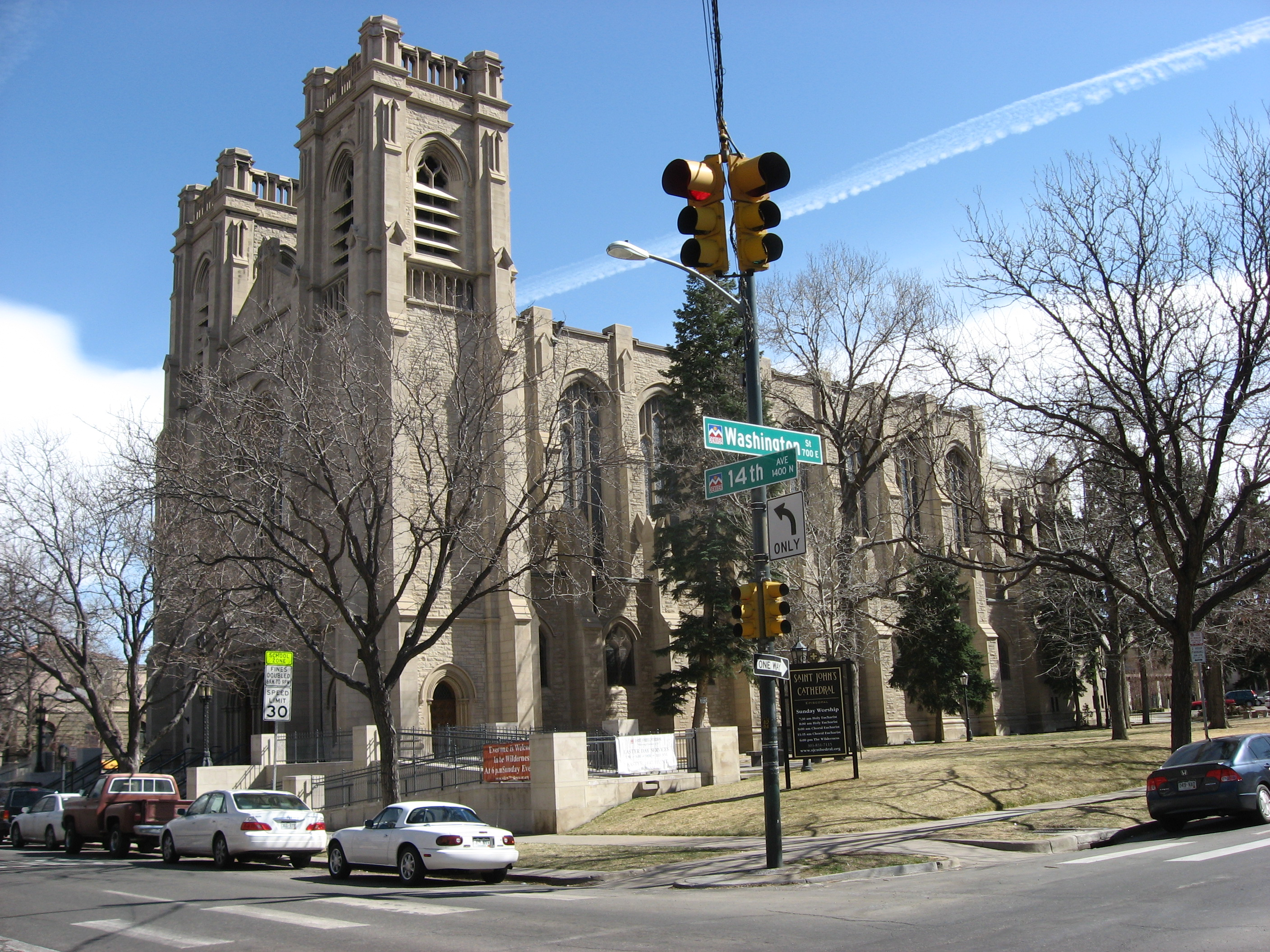
Coolidge served as a canon at the Cathedral of St. John in the Wilderness in Denver, Colorado.

In 1923, Secretary of Interior Herbert W. Work hired Coolidge to serve on the Committee of One Hundred, which was formed to "investigate conditions on reservations and report on the challenges facing indigenous peoples in the United States". Reverend Coolidge met with President Calvin Coolidge in December of that year.

In May 1923, Coolidge and other society leaders joined with reformer John Collier founding the American Indian Defense Association, a powerful new lobby in Washington. Writers, artists, anthropologists, and reformers who had been working in Indian affairs on a local basis, but who had not participated actively on the national Indian scene formed the organization.

In response, Secretary of the Interior Hubert Work invited an eminent group of Americans to form the "Advisory Council on Indian Affairs", which became known as the "Committee of One Hundred", to review and advise on Indian policy. The Committee included many distinguished men and women in public life, including Bernard M. Baruch, Nicholas Murray Butler, William Jennings Bryan, David Starr Jordan, Gen. John J. Pershing, Mark Sullivan, Roy Lyman Wilbur, William Allen White and Oswald Garrison Villard. Also included were John Collier of the American Indian Defense Association and M.K. Sniffen of the Indian Rights Association. Former Society leadership included not only Rev. Coolidge, but also Arthur Caswell Parker, Dennison Wheelock, Charles Eastman, Thomas L. Sloan, Father Phillip Gordon, Henry Roe Cloud, J.N.B. Hewitt and Fayette Avery McKenzie. Their recommendations prompted the Coolidge administration to commission the Brookings Institution to conduct a two-year study of the overall condition of Indians in the United States. Henry Roe Cloud and Fayette McKinsey were members of the research group.

In December 1923, Rev. Coolidge and Ruth Muskrat-Bronson presented President Calvin Coolidge a book written by G. E. E. Linquist titled "The Red Man In The United States" (1919) on behalf of the "Committee of One Hundred." In February 1928, findings and recommendations of "The Problem of Indian Administration", known as the Meriam Report, were published. The Meriam Report marked an ideological shift in American Indian policy and laid the foundation for the Indian New Deal under the Bureau of Indian Affairs leadership of John Collier during Franklin Delano Roosevelt's administration.

== Marriage and family ==
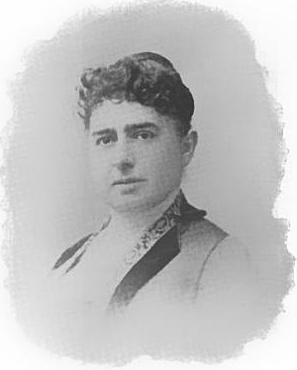
Grace Wetherbee Coolidge

Sherman met Grace D. Wetherbee, the daughter of an affluent New York City couple Mr. and Mrs. Gardner Wetherbee, on an Arapaho reservation in Wyoming in 1899. He was working as a missionary at the time. Grace, who had studied in the deaconess house in New York City, came west with Bishop Talbot with family from Pennsylvania to assist him in his missionary work at the Wind River Reservation. Coolidge made trips to New York and Grace came west again in 1901. Grace left a comfortable lifestyle that her father, owner of the Hotel Manhattan, then the tallest hotel in the world, provided for her.

The couple married on October 8, 1902 by Rev. F. J. Roberts at Fort Washakie, Wyoming. (Note: There were also reported to have been married at Cheyenne, Wyoming and Shoshone Agency in Wyoming.) Their union created a stir. Newspaper headlines, like "Society Girl's Heart and Hand Captured by an Indian", reflect the horror of a white woman marrying a Native American.

The Coolidges adopted two Native American girls, one of Shoshone heritage and another who was an Arapaho, both of whom were born in Wyoming. The girls studied in Pennsylvania at the Carlisle Indian Industrial School. Effie was born about 1898 and Virgie two years later. They also had Sarah, who was born in 1907 in Utah, and Sophia born about 1913 in Minnesota.

Grace Wetherbee Coolidge wrote extensively about her experiences working amongst the Indians. Collier's Weekly and The Outlook Magazine published her accounts. In 1917, a collection of her works was published as "Teepee Neighbors", a series of touching brief stories of life on the Wind River Reservation in the early twentieth century.

== Death and legacy ==
While visiting Los Angeles, he died on January 24, 1932, and was buried at Evergreen Cemetery in Colorado Springs. His wife Grace died five years later and was also buried there. She left $7,000 to the Wind River mission.

Coolidge was nominated as a candidate for Wyoming Citizen of the Century, among others who distinguished themselves in their life by their character, contributions, and accomplishments as Wyoming citizens during the twentieth century. As an advocate for Native American interests, he helped "launch two of the basic types of secular Pan-Indian movements".

== Sources ==
- Hertzberg, Hazel (1981). The Search for an American Indian Identity: Modern Pan-Indian Movements. Syracuse University Press. ISBN 978-0-8156-2245-1.
- Talbot, Ethelbert (1906). My People of the Plains. Harper & brothers.
- Venables, Robert W. (2004). American Indian history : five centuries of conflict & coexistence. Santa Fe, New Mexico: Clear Light Publishers. ISBN 978-1-57416-061-1.
- Whipple, Henry Benjamin (1899), Lights and Shadows of a Long Episcopate: Being Reminiscences and Recollections
