= Society of American Indians =

National American Indian rights organization

- Formation: 1911
- Dissolved: 1923
- Type: Native American rights
- Purpose: Pan-Indianism
- Headquarters: United States
- Official language: English

The Society of American Indians (1911–1923) was the first national American Indian rights organization run by and for American Indians. (Note: The Indian Rights Association (I.R.A.) was an American social activist group dedicated to the well being and acculturation of Native Americans. Founded in Philadelphia in 1882, the Indian Rights Associations (IRA) was highly influential in American Indian policy through the 1930s and remained involved as an organization until 1994. The organization's initial stated objective was to "bring about the complete civilization of the Indians and their admission to citizenship." 19th and 20th-century groups such as the Indian Rights Association considered themselves the "friends of the Indian" but, by modern standards, had little understanding of the cultural patterns and needs of Native Americans. Although the IRA and related groups were well intentioned and some of their activities were beneficial, many policies they helped enact were destructive to Indian people in the long term.) The Society pioneered twentieth century Pan-Indianism, the movement promoting unity among American Indians regardless of tribal affiliation. The Society was a forum for a new generation of American Indian leaders known as Red Progressives, prominent professionals from the fields of medicine, nursing, law, government, education, anthropology and ministry. They shared the enthusiasm and faith of Progressive Era white reformers in the inevitability of progress through education and governmental action.

The Society met at academic institutions, maintained a Washington, D.C. headquarters, conducted annual conferences and published a quarterly journal of American Indian literature by American Indian authors. The Society was one of the first proponents of an "American Indian Day." It was at the forefront of the fight for Indian citizenship and opening the U.S. Court of Claims to all tribes and bands in United States. The Indian Citizenship Law, signed on June 2, 1924, was a major achievement for the Society. The Society anticipated by decades the establishment of a federal Indian Claims Commission in 1946 to hear claims of Indian tribes against the United States. In 1978 such cases were transferred to the U.S. Court of Claims. The Society of American Indians was the forerunner of modern organizations such as the National Congress of American Indians.

== Pan-Indianism ==
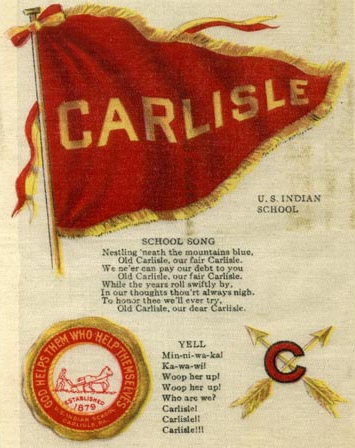
The Carlisle Indian School was a well-spring of Pan-Indianism.

The Carlisle Indian School and the Hampton Institute, off-reservation Eastern boarding schools, were well-springs of Pan-Indian leadership. (Note: The term Pan-Indian is seldom used by Indians, except by a few anthropologists and other intellectuals.) The most significant legacy of the Carlisle Indian School may have been the connections established by the students. Lifelong friendships were formed, and more importantly, ties between disparate Indian nations were forged. Launched in the hopes of Americanizing the students, the mixing of 85 Indian nations from all parts of the country also had instead the effect of "nationalizing the Indian." Dr. Carlos Montezuma described Carlisle "as a Gibraltor, a place to think, observe and decide." American Indian students from Alaska to Florida represented a rich diversity of tribes and traditions. While students learned Euro-American customs, they also learned about other tribes and religions and how each tribe was subject to irrational and casual dealings by government.Carlisle alumni across the nation maintained a Pan-Indian espirit de corps and they visited and communicated frequently.

== Early discussions ==
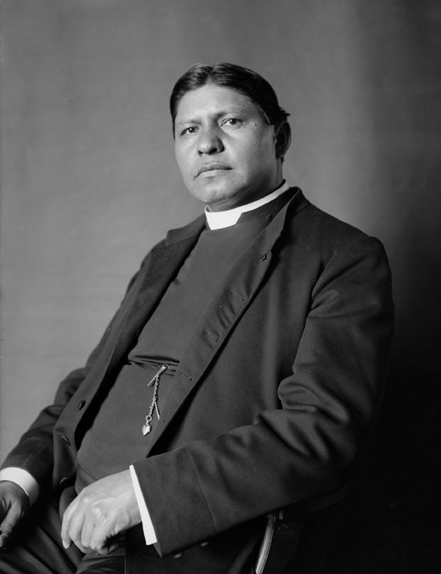
Rev. Sherman Coolidge

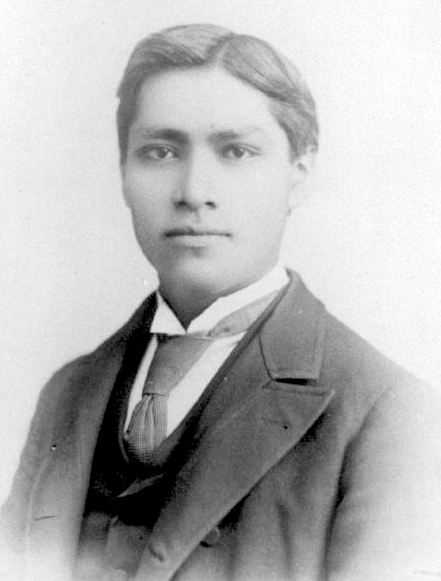
Dr. Carlos Montezuma

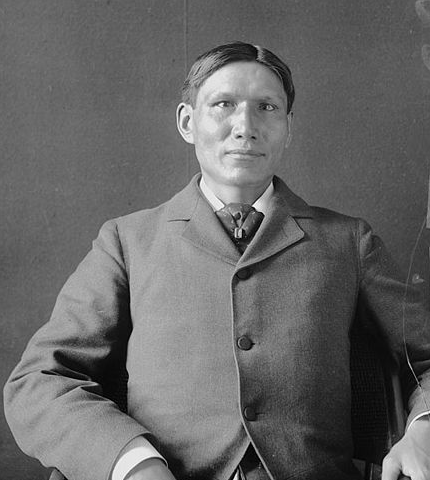
Dr. Charles A. Eastman

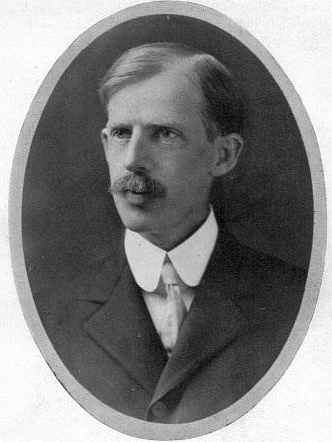
Dr. Fayette Avery McKenzie

In the early 1900s, three prominent American Indians, Dr. Charles Eastman, his brother Reverend John Eastman and Rev. Sherman Coolidge first discussed organizing a Pan-Indian or intertribal Indian rights organization. However, they concluded the time was not yet right to broadly advance the idea, believing such a movement "would not be understood either by our own people or the American people in general," present a "grave danger of arousing the antagonism of the Bureau," and compromise the many progressively-oriented Indians affiliated with Government service and programs. In 1903, Coolidge and sociologist Fayette Avery McKenzie met at the Wind River Reservation Boarding School, and they shared their ideas about forming national association run by Indians for Indians. In 1905, McKenzie joined the faculty of the Ohio State University, and in 1908 invited Charles Eastman, Dr. Carlos Montezuma and Coolidge to the Ohio State campus to deliver a series of lectures on "several phases of the Indian problem in a course which he was offering on "The Indian". The university lectures were well received, and they were covered by the local press, who helped turn Columbus's discovery of "new" Indians into news by printing striking photos of Coolidge and Montezuma on their front pages. The three well-known intellectuals scheduled a full week of speaking engagements with local civic organizations and churches, drawing further attention when they traveled about the city as a threesome to attend each other's events.

In 1909, after the formation of the National Association for the Advancement of Colored People, McKenzie sensed the time was ripe for a national organization of "educated and progressive Indians" and corresponded with Coolidge and Eastman calling for an Indian-led national conference on Indian affairs. McKenzie asserted that "the time has come when a 'Mohonk by Indians' can do even more for the country than a 'Mohonk for Indians.'" In a letter to inviting participants to a proposed 1909 Indian conference, McKenzie envisioned a new dawn at Columbus, writing, "even as the navigator Columbus discovered the old Indian in 1492, may we not hope that the city of Columbus shall discover the "new Indian." McKenzie called upon American Indians to form the first national pan-tribal organization run by and for Indians, and not a "friends of Indians" organization such as the progressive Indian Rights Association. However, McKenzie's first efforts to organize an Indian conference in 1909 failed.

== First meeting in Columbus ==
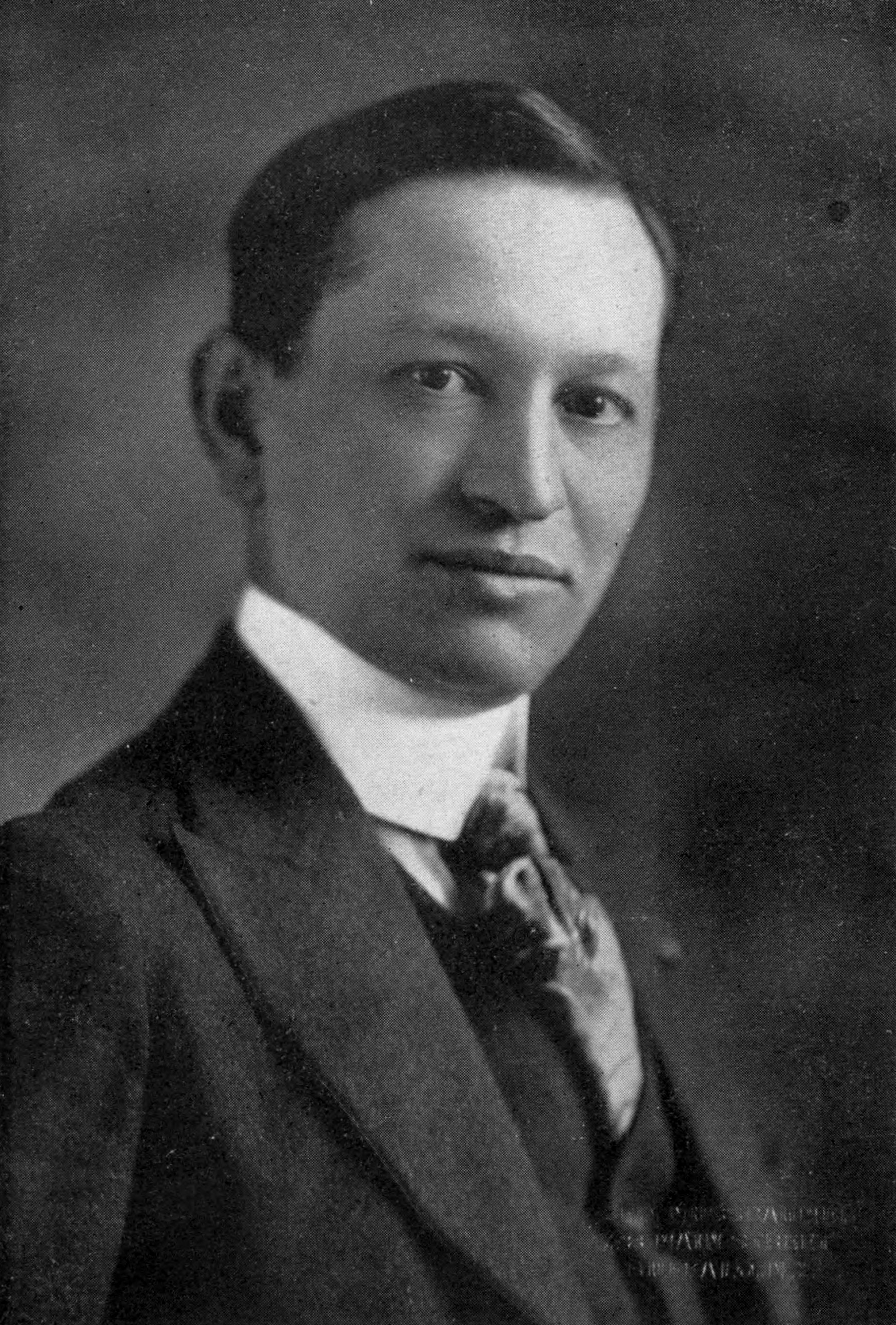
Dr. Arthur Caswell Parker

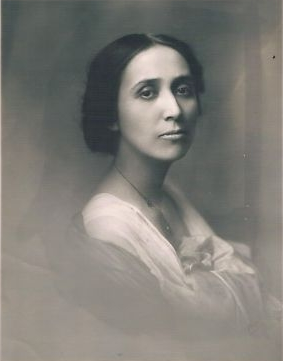
Laura Cornelius Kellogg

On April 3–4, 1911, at the invitation of McKenzie, six American Indian intellectuals attended a planning meeting at Ohio State University. The attendees were Dr. Charles Eastman, (Santee Dakota), physician; Dr. Carlos Montezuma, (Yavapai-Apache), physician; Thomas L. Sloan, (Omaha), attorney; Charles Edwin Dagenett, (Peoria), Bureau of Indian Affairs supervisor; Laura Cornelius Kellogg, (Oneida), educator; and Henry Standing Bear, (Oglala Lakota), educator. Arthur C. Parker, (Seneca), an anthropologist, was also invited to the meeting, but a fire at the New York State Capitol, which housed the New York State Museum, where he served as an archeologist, precluded his attendance.

After the meeting, the committee issued a public announcement of the formation of the American Indian Association, plans for an inaugural National Indian Conference to be held that fall at Ohio State University and reasons for the conference: "One. The highest ethical forces of America have been endeavoring on a large scale and in a systematic way to bring the Native Americans into modern life. It is well to see whether these efforts have brought results. Two. The time is come when the Indian should be encouraged to develop self-help. This can be achieved only with the attainment of a race consciousness and a race leadership. We cannot predict the race leader, the gathering of the educated, aggressive members of all the tribes is a prerequisite to discuss discovery. Three. The Indian has certain contributions of value to offer to our government and our people. These contributions will be made more efficiently if made in authorizing collectively. They will, at least they may, save us immense losses from mistaken policies which we will might otherwise follow. Four. The white man is somewhat uncomfortable under a conviction that a century of dishonor quote has not been redeemed. If it any degree can convince himself and his red brother that he is willing to do what he can for the race whose lands has he has [sic] occupied, a new step toward social justice will have been taken. "

On April 5, 1911, the press reported the meetings as "without precedent in the history of the country, only paralleled in significance by those held immediately after the close of the Civil War for the purpose of organizing intelligent work among the freed men." It was further reported that the new national organization was being established for the purpose of "bettering of conditions for the Indians and the upbuilding a race consciousness", and that in October an official invitation will be extended by the Ohio Columbus Centennial Commission to have the second annual meeting at this body held in conjunction with the centennial celebration.

== Temporary Executive Committee ==
Shortly after the April meeting, a Temporary Executive Committee was formed, consisting of 18 prominent Indians: Charles E. Dagenett (Peoria), Chairman; Laura Cornelius Kellogg (Oneida), Secretary; and Rosa La Flesche (Chippewa), Corresponding Secretary and Treasurer. Members of the Committee included William Hazlett (Blackfoot), Harry Kohpay (Osage), Charles D. Carter (Chickasaw and Cherokee), Emma Johnson (Pottawatomie), Howard E. Gansworth (Tuscarora), Henry Roe Cloud (Winnebago), Marie Louise Bottineau Baldwin, (Chippewa), Robert De Poe (Klamath), Charles Doxon (Onondaga) and Benjamin Caswell (Chippewa). Professor McKenzie was appointed "Local Representative, Columbus, Ohio."

Committee members were Indian progressives, many of whom were educated in white institutions, lived and worked primarily in white society. Most believed Indian advancement required education, hard work, and aligning Indian attitudes, values, and lifestyle to white culture.

The committee adopted a Statement of Purpose composed of six principles that addressed concepts of equal rights, good citizenship, and race betterment, and asserted that in all Association activities, "the honor of the race and the good of the country will always be paramount." The preamble declares that the time has come when the American Indian race should contribute, in a more united way, its influence and exertion with the rest of the citizens of the United States in all lines of progress and reform, for the welfare of the Indian race in particular, and humanity in general."

"First. To promote and cooperate with all efforts looking to the advancement of the Indian in enlightenment which leave him free as a man to develop according to the natural laws of social evolution. Second. To provide, through our open conference, the means for a free discussion on all subjects bearing on the welfare of the race. Third. To present in a just light a true history of the race, to preserve its records, and to emulate it's distinguishing virtues. Fourth. To promote citizenship among Indians and to obtain the rights thereof. Fifth. To establish a legal department to investigate Indian problems, and to suggest and to obtain remedies. Sixth. To exercise the right to oppose any movement which may be detrimental to the race. Seventh. To direct its energies exclusively to general principles and universal interest, and not allow itself to be used for any personal or private interest. The honor of the race and the good of the country will always be paramount."

On June 21 and 22, 1911, the Temporary Executive Committee met at the home of Laura Cornelius Kellogg in Seymour, Wisconsin, attended by prominent Oneida attorneys Chester Poe Cornelius and Dennison Wheelock. Charles E. Dagenett had the chair, with Emma Johnson, Rosa LaFlesche and Fayette McKenzie in attendance.

On June 25, 1911, the committee sent out a statement of intent to approximately four thousand Indians throughout the nation pointing out the vital necessity for an "organization that shall voice the best judgment of the Indian people, and that shall command the attention of the United States."

== Inaugural Society Conference ==
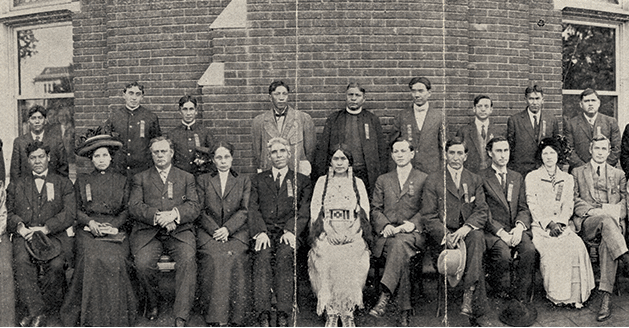
The Society of American Indians, Ohio State University, Columbus, Ohio, Inaugural Conference, 1911

From his faculty position at Ohio State, and given the official title of "Local Representative", McKenzie organized much of the formal and informal proceedings of the event, from logistics to program development. On July 29, 1911, The Washington Post reported that all Indians living in United States had been invited to attend a conference in Columbus, Ohio, October 12 to 15, to map out a concerted plan for the uplift and betterment of the race. One of the main purposes of the meeting is to demonstrate to the American people that the Indian is no longer a savage, and that the last twenty years have shown a wonderful development of intellect and character among the Indian tribes. It was further reported that Senators Robert L. Owen of Oklahoma, Charles Curtis of Kansas and Representative Charles D. Carter of Oklahoma, all of Indian parentage, joined in the call for the meeting.

McKenzie planned a symbolic event with national press coverage and worked with Arthur C. Parker to recruit speakers, design the conference program and secure endorsements from the Bureau of Indian Affairs, City of Columbus, Ohio State University and several local civic and religious organizations. The response was positive. Impressed with the historical significance of the April meeting, Ohio State President William Oxley Thompson, Columbus Mayor George Sidney Marshall, as well as by the President of the Chamber of Commerce, the President of the Ministerial Association, the Secretary of the YMCA, the Secretary of the State Historical and Archaeological Society, and the President of the Columbus Federation of Labor invited the new American Indian Association to hold their first national conference in Columbus, on Columbus Day, October, 1911. "Word has come to our ears that you are planning to meet in national assembly for the first time in history to discuss the problems which devolve upon the Indian race, and we, therefore, hasten to invite you to light the camp-fire first in the city named for the first white man who visited these shores. Let us, if we may, forget any animosities of the past, and jointly work for those conditions and those policies which in the future will justify peace because based upon the principles of equity, intelligence and progress. The high position which your leaders are reaching make us eager to welcome the representatives of all the tribes in the name of Ohio State University, the City of Columbus, and the civic and religious bodies of our city." The invitation was accepted and a call issued for a national conference.

On October 12, 1911, the Society's inaugural conference was convened on the campus of the Ohio State University in Columbus, Ohio, symbolically held on Columbus Day as a fresh beginning for American Indians. From October 12–17, 1911, approximately 50 prominent American Indian scholars, clergy, writers, artists, teachers and physicians attended the historic event, and was reported widely by national news media. (Note: Only 44 active members are listed in the program as being in attendance at the conference, out of a little more than 100 active members in total. The non-Indian Associates, 125 of them, outnumbered the Indians.) The Society was formally welcomed by university and city officials, and a personal address by the U.S. Commissioner of Indian Affairs, Robert G. Valentine. Evening entertainment was provided by several of the Indian participants and by a quartette sent from the Carlisle Indian School in Carlisle, Pennsylvania. Group sessions were held on issues affecting American Indians including issues of citizenship, higher education, Indians in the professions, Indian laws and the future of reservations. On Sunday, participants were delegated to appear at various churches in Columbus. Participants organized themselves under the temporary name of the American Indian Association, elected officers, and adopted a constitution and by-laws.

The business session was attended by Indian delegates only. Thomas L. Sloan, Rev. Sherman Coolidge and Dr. Charles Eastman were nominated for Chairman of the Executive Committee, and Sloan won. Charles E. Dagenett, who had declined to continue as Executive Committee Chairman, was elected secretary-treasurer. Other Executive Committee members elected were Hiram Chase, Arthur C. Parker, Laura Cornelius Kellogg and Henry Standing Bear. The committee was directed to "provide a provisional constitution for a representative convention of all the Indians in the country," recommending that each tribe send at least two representatives. Washington was selected as the headquarters and the Executive Committee was to watch legislation affecting Indian Affairs and to cooperate with the Indian Office "for the welfare of the Indians to the best of their ability." The Constitution divided membership into classes including active, Indian associate and associate. Only Indians could vote and hold office. Associate members were persons of non-Indian blood interested in Indian welfare. The Society letterhead made clear the status of Indians and non-Indians, "Memberships: active and associate: persons of Indian blood only."John Milton Oskison (Cherokee), an editor of Collier's magazine, and Angel De Cora (Winnebago), art educator at the Carlisle Indian School were commissioned to create the Society emblem. (Note: The Society's formation coincided with a growing interest among whites for Native American culture, art, and music. Most Society annual conferences included Indian entertainment for the public, which largely consisted of stereotypical depictions of Indians in tribal costume engaging in war dances and rituals. Although controversial among Society leaders, many of them viewed such exhibitions as a way to educate curious and interested whites about Indians' rich culture and heritage. However, Melissa Wick Patterson suggested an important irony, noting the elements of Native culture that allowed Society members to exploit white interest limited Indians ability to pursue their goals of citizenship and legal rights, as exhibitions and performances perpetuated stereotypical images of Indians.) The committee also changed the name from the "American Indian Association" to the "Society of American Indians" "in order to remove it from the category of white–run "Indian associations" such as the Indian Rights Association and unmistakably as an Indian movement. Washington, D.C. was selected as the headquarters, the executive committee was directed to watch legislation affecting Indian affairs and for the welfare of Indians to the best of their ability. This was to be an association run by Indians.

== Red Progressives ==
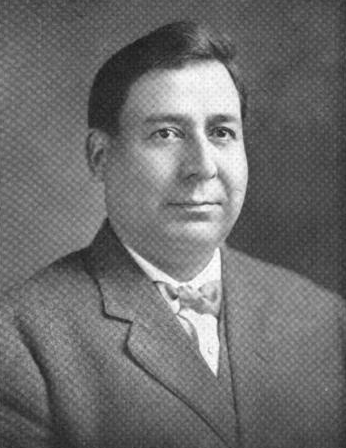
Dennison Wheelock

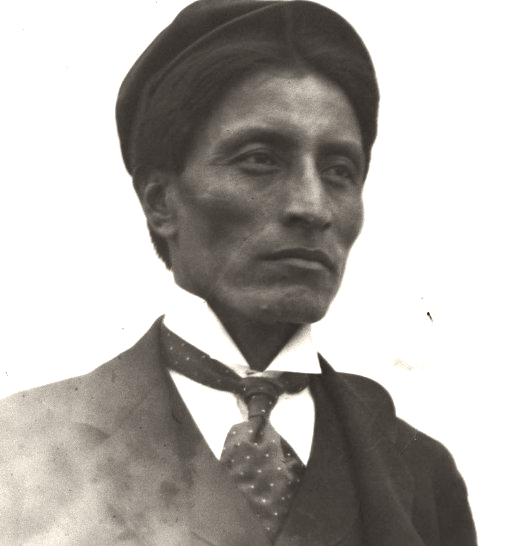
Chauncey Yellow Robe

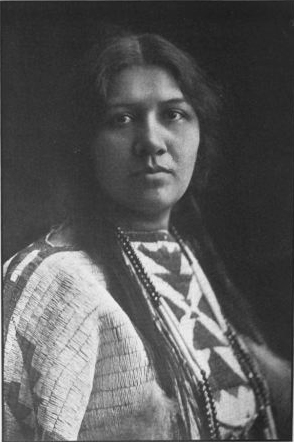
Angel De Cora

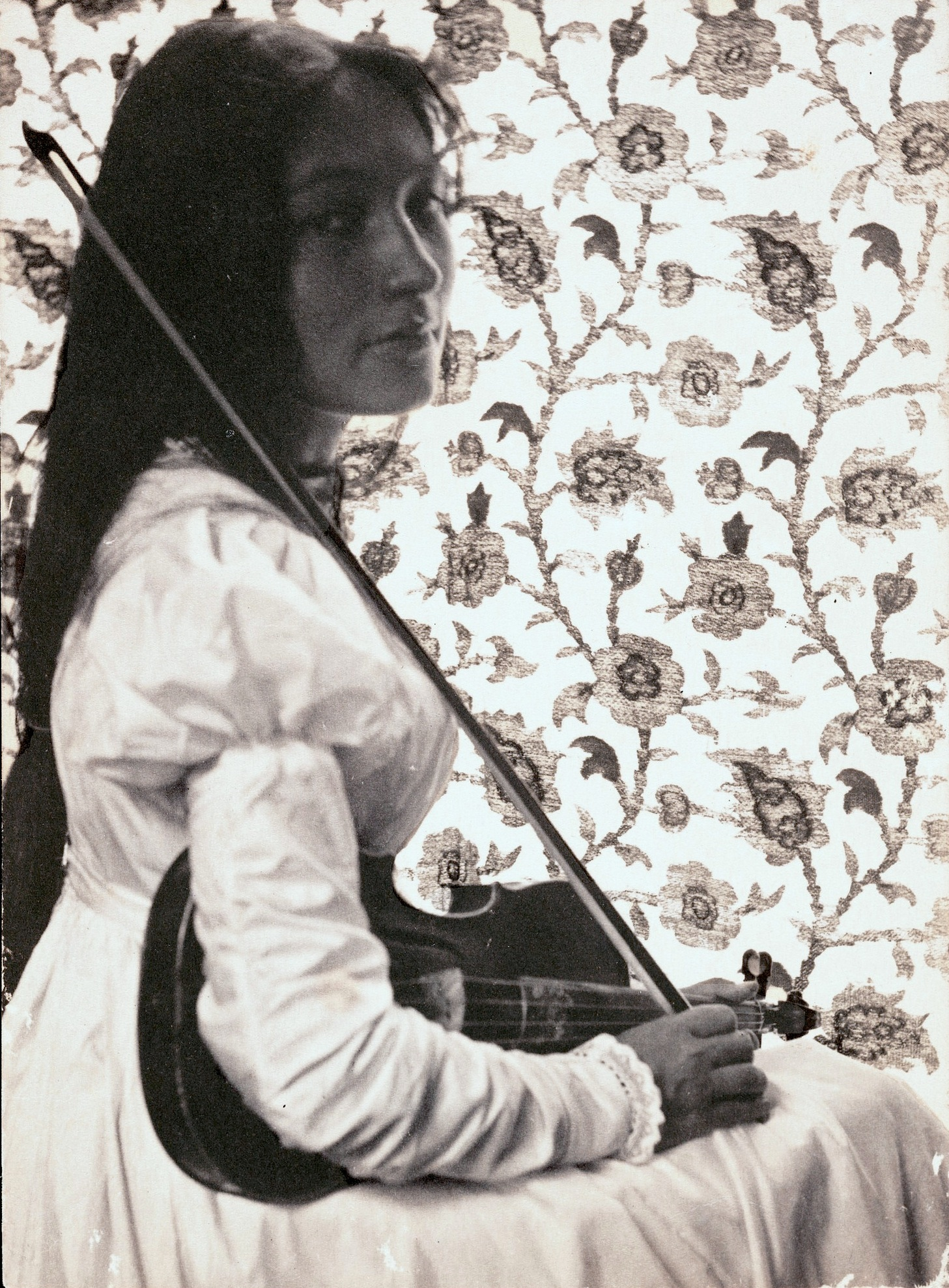
Gertrude Simmons Bonnin

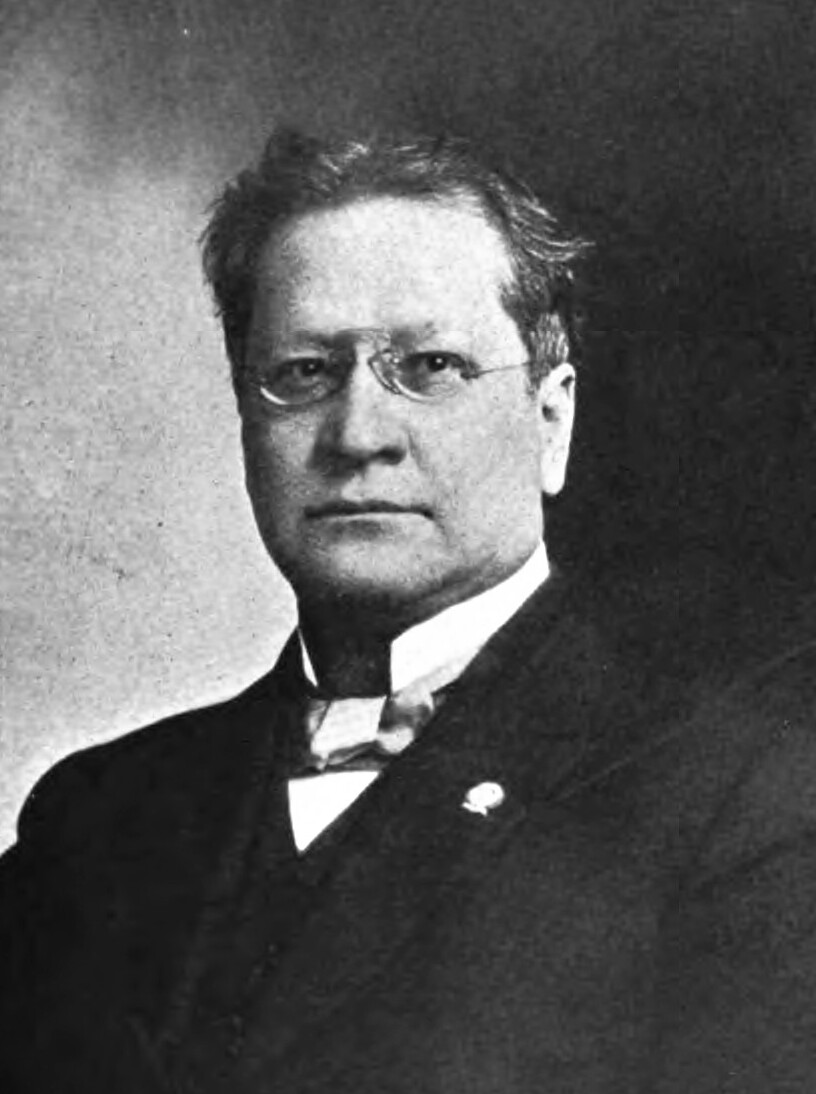
John Napoleon Brinton Hewitt

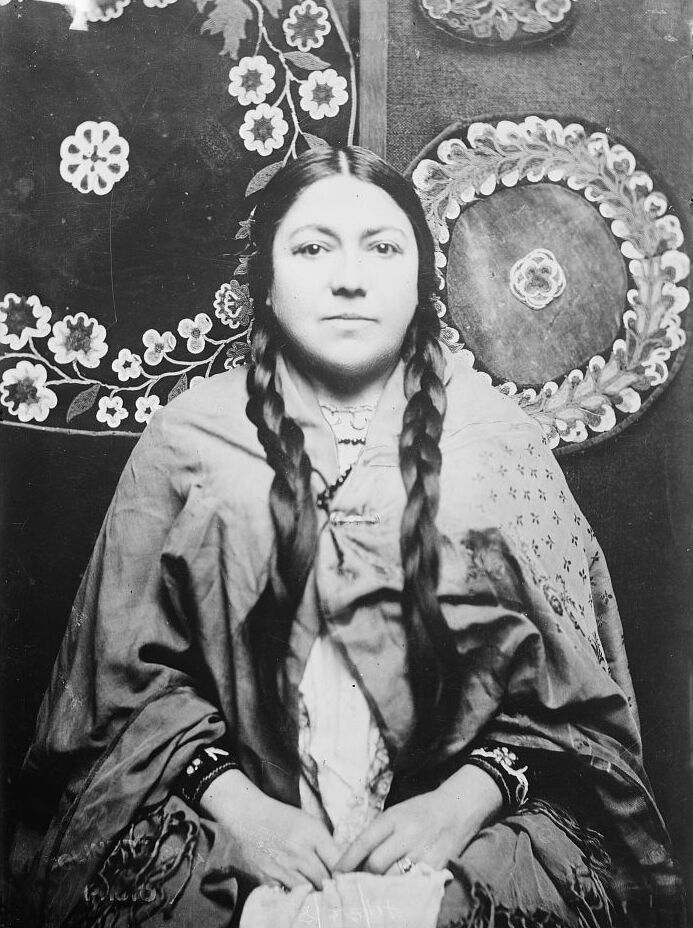
Marie Louise Bottineau Baldwin

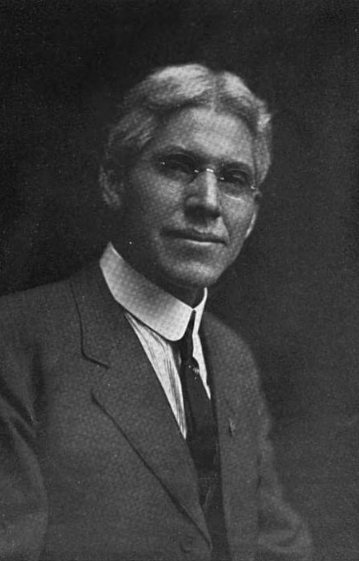
Charles R. Doxon

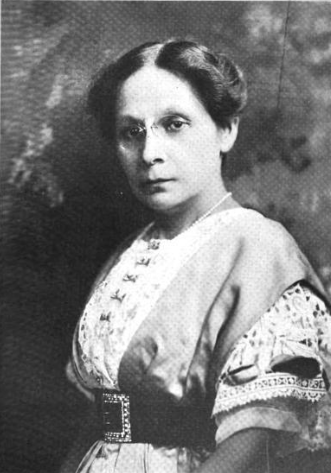
Rosa La Flesche

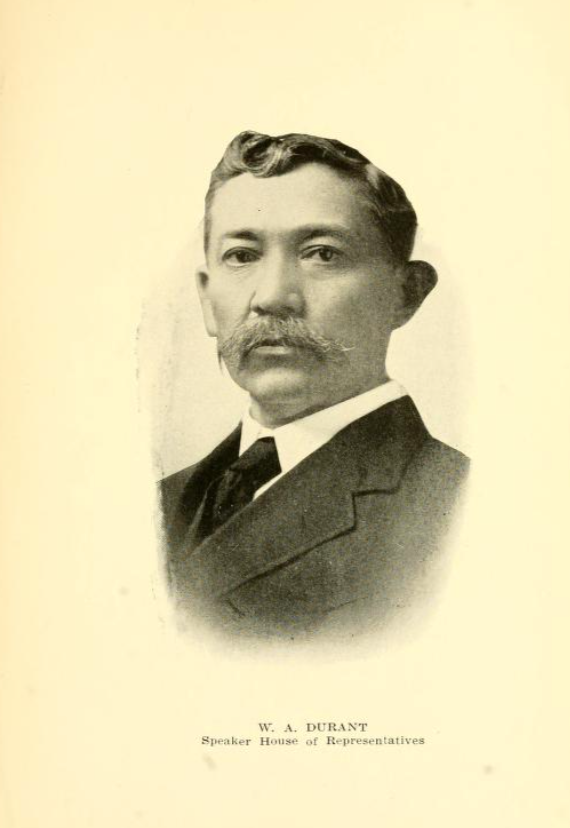
William A. Durant

The early leaders of the Society were known as the "Red Progressives". Progressive American Indians referred to themselves as such because they shared the enthusiasm and faith of the progressive white reformers in the inevitability of progress, and belief in social improvement through education and governmental action. The group chose October 12, 1911, Columbus Day, as the opening of the founding conference of the Indian reformers and the start of a new era for American Indians.

Society members were educated professionals from the fields of medicine, nursing, law, government, education, anthropology, ethnology and clergy. There were no chiefs or tribal leaders amongst them. The most important single influence at the conference was that of eastern Indian boarding schools, especially Carlisle. The bond among Carlisle alumni was so strong that it provided the major source of Pan-Indian leadership. (Note: At least eleven of the Temporary Executive Committee were connected to the Eastern boarding schools, eight having graduated from Carlisle, two from Hampton, with one at a staff position at Carlisle.) Red Progressives remained in close touch with tribal life and used both Indian and American names. Many were the sons and daughters of influential tribal leaders from New York, the Great Lakes, Oklahoma and the Great Plains. Of the expanded committee, six were born or had lived in Oklahoma, and almost all were from Eastern, Prairie or Plains Tribes: four from tribes of the Six Nations Confederacy, two from the Lakota, two from the Five Civilized Tribes, three from the Chippewa, one each from the Blackfoot, Pottawattamie, Winnebago, Omaha, Osage, Apache and Klamath, and born into progressive families and tribes with social and marital connections to non-Indians. Also many were previously or currently employed by the Bureau of Indian Affairs. Their perspective was unique, and they used their education to champion American Indian rights.

In April 1912, when the proceedings of the Columbus conference were published, Society membership had increased to 101 actives, about one-third of whom were women, and approximately the same number of non-native associates. By 1913, active members grew to the high point of nearly 230 individuals representing almost 30 tribes. Membership included Arthur Bonnicastle, (Osage), community leader; Gertrude Bonnin, (Yankton Dakota), educator and author; Rev. Benjamin Brave, (Oglala Lakota), minister; Estaiene M. DePeltquestangue, (Kickapoo); nurse; William A. Durant, (Choctaw), lawyer; Rev. Philip Joseph Deloria, (Onondaga), priest; Rev. John Eastman, (Santee Dakota), minister; Father Philip B. Gordon, (Chippewa), priest; Albert Hensley, (Winnebago); missionary; John Napoleon Brinton Hewitt, (Tuscarora), linguist and ethnographer; William J. Kershaw, (Menominee), attorney; Susan LaFlesche, (Omaha), physician; Francis LaFlesche, (Omaha), anthropologist; Rev. Delos Lone Wolf (Kiowa), minister; Louis McDonald, (Ponca); businessman; Luther Standing Bear, (Oglala Lakota), educator; Dennison Wheelock, (Oneida), musician, composer, lawyer; and Chauncey Yellow Robe, (Sicangu Lakota), educator.

The official photograph of the Inaugural Society Conference in Columbus, Ohio, shows members attired in the fashion of the day, the Indian clergyman among them wearing clerical collars. There's no hint "of Indianness" in their costume with the exception of Nora McFarland from Carlisle who, wearing an Indian dress, was seated at the center of the group. The Society joined with reformist progressives in opposition to Wild West shows, theatrical troupes, circuses and most motion picture firms. The Society believed that theatrical shows were demoralizing and degrading to Indians, and discouraged Indians from Wild Westing. Chauncey Yellow Robe wrote that "Indians should be protected from the curse of the Wild West show schemes, wherein the Indians have been led to the white man's poison cup and have become drunkards." Red Progressives believed Wild West shows exploited Native Americans and vigorously opposed theatrical portrayals of Native Americans as savages and vulgar stereotypes. From 1886 to the onset of World War I, reformist progressives fought a war of images with Wild West shows before public exhibitions at world fairs, expositions and parades portraying the model Carlisle Indian Industrial School as a new generation of Native Americans embracing civilization, education and industry. (Note: Commissioner John H. Oberly explained in 1889: "The effect of traveling all over the country among, and associated with, the class of people usually accompanying shows, circuses and exhibitions, attended by all the immoral and unchristianizing surroundings incident to such a life, is not only most demoralizing to the present and future welfare of the Indian, but it creates a roaming and unsettled disposition and educates him in a manner entirely foreign and antagonistic to that which has been and now is the policy of the Government.")

The early course of the Society was influenced by many factors. Pan-Indianism developed during the period when modern social science came of age, and sociologists and anthropologists helped define the common ground of "race". Reformers of the bully Progressive era were inveterate founders of organizations, translating ideas into organizations and organizations into action. Problems existed to be solved, and the democratic promise existed to be fulfilled. Arthur C. Parker, an anthropologist, visioned the "Old Council Fire" composed of American Indian men and women from all tribes of United States. He believed that the Society should adopt an organizational format like that of "friends of Indians" organizations, meet at academic institutions rather than on reservations, maintain a Washington headquarters, publish a quarterly journal, conduct annual conferences and be a vehicle for the expression of a pan-Indian identity.

Christianity and Freemasonry played crucial roles in the Society. Christian ideas of human brotherhood and the equality of all men before God complemented anthropological ideas of inherent racial equality. Most of the Red Progressives were Christians, Protestant and Catholic, and some were ordained ministers and priests. Others were religious peyotists from more Christianized tribes. Freemasonry exercised an important influence on the development of Pan-Indianism in the 1920s. Almost every male Indian involved in the Society was an active Freemason. Arthur C. Parker, who used both his "American" and his Seneca name "Ga-wa-so-wa-neh", wrote a pamphlet on American Indian Masonry, published in 1919 by the Buffalo Consistory. Parker wrote of Masonry's implicit link with American Indians, and noted that the Iroquois, especially the Senecas, were "inherent" Freemasons. He shared the view of his great-uncle Ely S. Parker, the first American Indian Commissioner of Indian Affairs, that Masonry offered upward mobility in the white world, and would preserve the memory of the Indian, "If my race shall disappear from this continent." (Note: A critical interpretation of Indians and Freemasons is found in Deloria 1993)

== Bureau of Indian Affairs ==
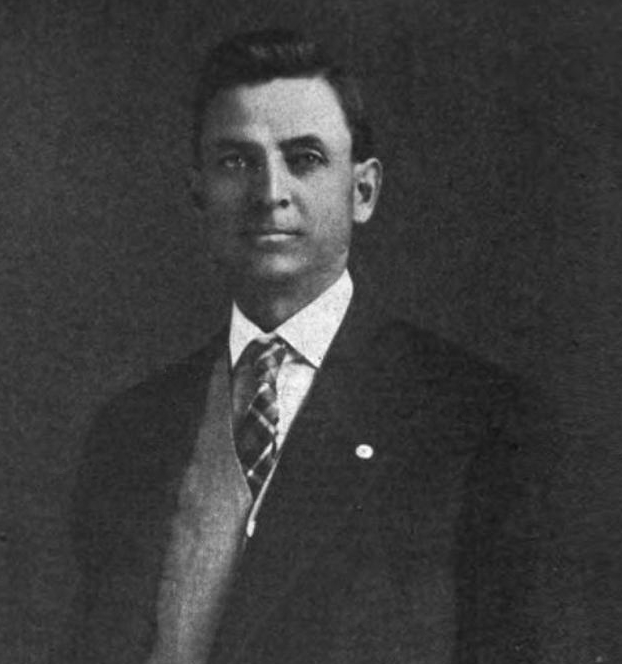
Charles Edwin Dagenett

The Bureau of Indian Affairs was a topic of constant and divisive debate within the Society. During the conference, a contentious discussion grew out of the perceived influence of the Bureau of Indian Affairs within the Society. Many Indians regarded the Bureau with contempt and viewed it as representing white oppression and control, and that Indians affiliated with the Bureau worked against the race. McKenzie noted that "a considerable body of Indians are positively afraid of and opposed to the government," and that they feel "a government employee is not morally free to express his own independent judgment." At the first Columbus conference, Charles Edwin Dagenett, who as Supervisor of Employment was the highest ranking Indian in the Bureau, was elected Secretary-Treasurer. This contributed to suspicion among Indians of white control of the Society. Society leaders debated whether the Bureau of Indian Affairs and federal reservation system should be abolished and whether employees of the Bureau holding offices could be loyal to the "race" and the Society. Dr. Carlos Montezuma and Father Philip B. Gordon believed it was not possible for a member in the employment of the government to be at the same time loyal to the Society, while Rev. Coolidge, Marie Baldwin and Gertrude Bonnin maintained it was possible for an employee of the Indian Service to be an equally loyal to his race and to his government. Montezuma detested the Bureau of Indian Affairs and reservation life, and soon became convinced the Society was a puppet of the Bureau. At the fifth annual conference in Lawrence, Kansas, September 28–October 3, 1915, Coolidge was re-elected president and Arthur C. Parker as secretary, and Daganett was replaced as first vice-president by William A. Durant. Afterwards, Daganett and Rosa B. Laflesche, the assistant secretary in the Washington office, withdrew from Society affairs.

The Bureau was a major employer of American Indians and the debate regarding "race loyalty" virtually eliminated one of the Society's major constituencies. Sloan, a candidate for the position of U.S. Indian Commissioner urged prudence, "The Indian Bureau has grown to be a necessity for a great many employees in United States government. In case the reservations were destroyed, jobs would have to be sought for by a great many people who are now in the Indian service, and this seems that that cannot be done at one stroke." Most of the leadership believed that the reservation system should go and the Indian Bureau abolished. But as much as they resented the Bureau, they could not reconcile themselves to a policy which would deliver older Indians into the hands of rapacious enemies and destroy forever the possibility protecting the Indian land base.

== McKenzie's role ==
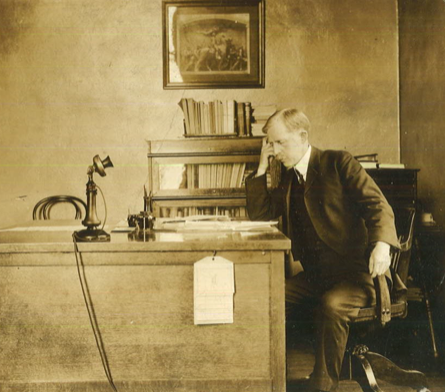
Dr. Fayette Avery McKenzie

Fayette Avery McKenzie was the first American sociologist to specialize in Indian affairs. McKenzie criticized the government's Indian policy and was well connected to the political establishment in Washington, D.C. Arthur C. Parker, Secretary of the Society from 1911–1915, regarded McKenzie as the "father of the movement." (Note: Historians Hertzberg, Siegal and Holm confirm McKenzie's role as the intellectual stimulus of the Society and movement.) McKenzie respected the Society's mantra of "for Indians and by Indians" and understood Indians' distrust of Whites. McKenzie downplayed his role as "Local Representative" for the Society and worked behind the scenes. He wrote to Parker, "Whatever I may say is subject to two suspicions: First that my race prevents me understanding the situation. Second, that I may have some ulterior motive." "I am always embarrassed by doubt in my mind as to whether I shall act and speak, or whether I shall contribute most by silence. Everyone who says anything to me tells me to proceed and that the Indians have confidence in me and I am glad and believe that is so, even though doubtful as to what extent that confidence involves action." While Parker was determined that the Society should be run by Indians, it did not diminish his desire for McKenzie's counsel and assistance in managing the organization. In short time, Parker was overwhelmed with the volume of Society work and contemplated resigning. McKenzie exhorted him to stay with the Society, noting "it is not impossible that you are the only man who can save the situation and that you may have to do it by constant correspondence, keeping all in touch one with the other, and keeping all satisfied that equal justice is being arranged for." Parker teamed with McKenzie to manage the Society and navigate politics. Responsibilities included publications, planning conferences, drafting and lobbying legislation and membership services.

McKenzie's organizational principles were to ensure harmony and unity within the Society, work cooperatively with the white establishment and uphold standards of quality and achievement for Indians. He wrote, "No issue, no bill, no policy is comparable in importance with a demonstration that Indians can maintain unity and cordial feelings even at times of difference upon specific points." McKenzie was well connected to the political establishment in Washington, D.C., and by 1914, he solicited over 400 Non-native associate memberships from influential academicians, politicians and Progressive organizations. Parker noted, "I am sure that we all wish you to secure for us as many members as you can and win for us the right kind of friends." Parker was deeply grateful for McKenzie's support and assistance through the Society's most productive years, and in 1913 nominated McKenzie for Commissioner of Indian Affairs to Franklin K. Lane, then U.S. Secretary of the Interior. Writing without McKenzie's knowledge, Parker cited "his friend's broad experience, special knowledge of the Indian, rare understanding of the legal and social status of our native wards. I know of no fitter person for the difficult task that falls upon the Office of the Indian Commissioner." McKenzie and Parker collaborated until 1915, when McKenzie departed Ohio State University and his friends in Columbus to assume the Presidency of Fisk University in Nashville, Tennessee. Parker and McKenzie remained lifelong friends and colleagues.

== Journals and publications ==
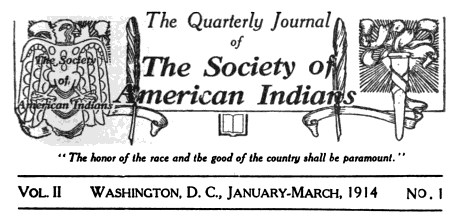

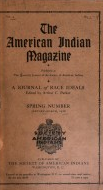

The Society's Quarterly Journal was the first twentieth-century forum for professional American Indian writers and one of the Society's most enduring testimonials. The new "American Indian literature" covered a wide array of topics editorial comments on national and local reservation problems. Distinguished American Indian editors and writers for the Quarterly Journal included: Arthur Parker, Rev. Sherman Coolidge, Henry Roe Cloud, John M. Oskison, Gertrude Bonnin, Carlos Montezuma and Dennison Wheelock. Luther Standing Bear, Dr. Charles Eastman and Gertrude Simmons Bonnin who were born and raised in the oral traditions American Indian culture and educated in Euro-American customs, wrote significant historic accounts of their people and history in English. (Note: In a letter to Prof. McKenzie 1912, Arthur Parker pondering whether a properly staffed Indians school might not help to further develop new "Indian literature.")

The first issue of the Quarterly Journal, authorized in Columbus, was published on April 15, 1913. The journal masthead carried on one side the Society's emblem, the American Eagle, and on the other a lighted torch. Underneath was the legend, taken from the Society statement of purposes: "The honor of the race and the good of the country shall be paramount." Arthur C. Parker, was the editor-general, while contributing editors included Sherman Coolidge, Henry Roe Cloud, Howard Gansworth, Carlos Montezuma and John M. Oskison. An editorial in the first issue proclaimed that the publication marked "a new departure in the history of the race."

"Never before has an attempt been made on the part of a national Indian organization to publish a periodical devoted to the interest of the entire race. That heretofore this has not been done, points to reasons beyond the mere conservatism of the race and the drawback of hundreds of native dialects. This venture is therefore more or less an experiment based upon the faith of the Society in its own integrity and the essential pride of the race in its position as the native race of America." The role of the Society and the problems confronting it were discussed at length in several editorials. "The open plan is to develop race leaders. These leaders will not come from those so merged in American life that they have forgotten they are Indians or from those so bound by the lack of education or reservation environment that their vision is narrow, but from the small company of Indians abroad vision." Thereafter, the Society published a scholarly journal for seven years, the Quarterly Journal of the American Indian (1913–1915), and renamed the American Indian Magazine (1916–1920).

== Early achievements ==
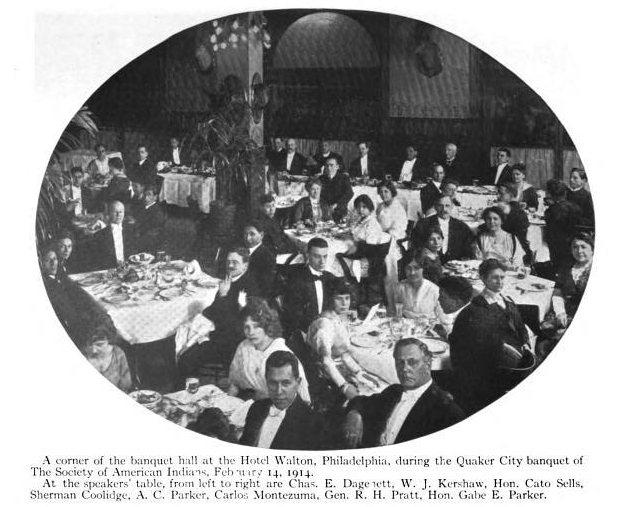
The Society of American Indians, Philadelphia, Pennsylvania, 1914

In 1913, the Society was flourishing and active membership increased to more 230 individuals representing almost 30 tribes. Associate membership had grown to over 400, including men and women from the American Indian Defense Association, missionaries, businessman, anthropologists and other academics. A number the white Indian Bureau employees and educators from Indian schools also joined and the future of the organization seemed bright. The Society was similar to the white reform organizations and the developing black movements of the Progressive Era. Middle class, well-educated, they preached self-help, race pride, and responsibility.

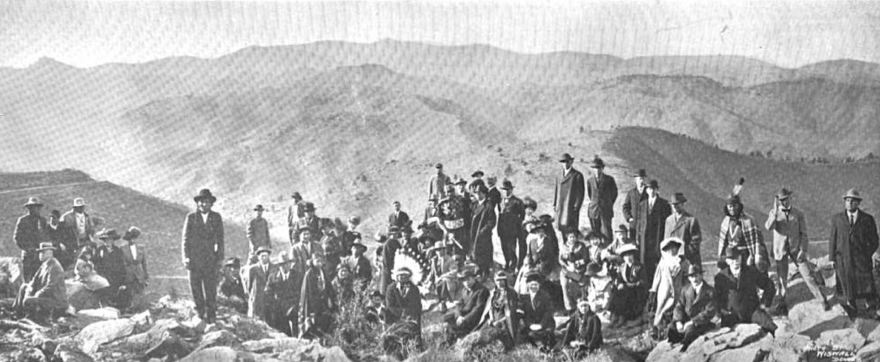
The Society of American Indians, 3rd Annual Conference, A group of members on excursion at Wildcat Point, near Denver, Colorado, October 15, 1913

=== Denver platform ===
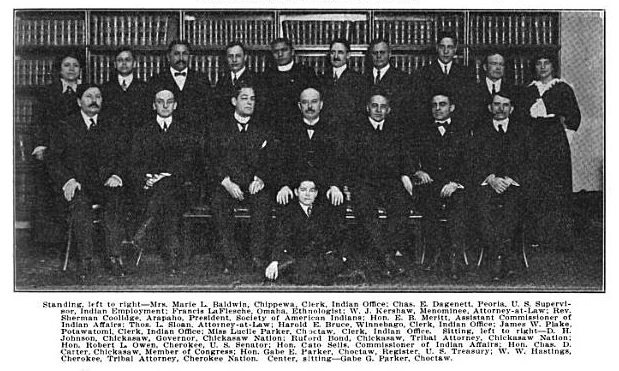
Society of American Indians, Washington, D.C., 1914

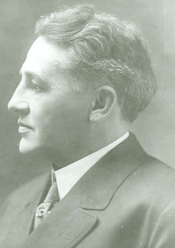
Hon. Charles D. Carter

The conference in Denver, Colorado, October 14–20, 1913, was probably the most representative and the most amicable in the history of Society. Rev. Sherman Coolidge and Arthur C. Parker were reelected as president and secretary, and William J. Kershaw became first-vice president replacing Thomas L. Sloan. Charles E. Dagenett was elected second vice president. In later years, Parker often referred to the "Denver Platform" as the ideal statement of the organizations goals. In 1914, the Society established a headquarters in Washington, D.C., across the street from the Indian Office, and lobbied for the passage of "two great objects of immense importance to the Indians and to the nation", the "Carter Bill" and the "Stephens Bill".

The Carter Bill, introduced by Oklahoma Congressman Charles D. Carter, (Chickasaw and Cherokee), Chairman of the House Indian Committee, codified the laws relating to Indian citizenship, and provided "that every Indian born within the territorial limits of the United States is hereby declared to be a citizen of the United States, entitled to all the rights, privileges, and immunities of such citizens." The Stephens Bill called for opening to Indian tribes the United States Court of Claims to facilitate settlement of long neglected Indian land claims. Treaty based tribal claims against the government were treated like those of foreign nations, and a special act of Congress was required before an Indian claim could be presented to the court. McKenzie and Parker believed that the legislation would provide Indians peace of mind and assurance that "no unnecessary expense on the one side, or cruel exploitation on the other, shall longer be associated with the attainment of justice for the Indian."

On February 14, 1914, in the flush of enthusiasm following the Denver conference, the Executive Committee held its meeting in Philadelphia, Pennsylvania, in a more elaborate fashion than the usual session and included a banquet. In October 1914, Dennison Wheelock hosted the Society's annual October convention in Madison, Wisconsin. In December 1914, the Society met in Washington, D.C. and received a first-class reception from the federal government. Commissioner Cato Sells welcomed them to the nation's capital where they toured the Bureau of Indian Affairs, and visited the White House to meet with President Woodrow Wilson. After shaking hands with the president, Wheelock presented the Society's petition in support of the Carter Bill and Stephens Bill. Wheelock spoke, "We believe that you feel, with the progressive members of your race, that it is anomalous permanently to conserve within the nation groups of people whose civic condition by legislation is different from the normal standard of American life." While President Wilson was impressed, both bills garnered little political traction in Washington. Arthur C. Parker noted the political aversion to Indian rights legislation when he observed that "one senator wrote me that there was a great deal of prejudice in considering Indian matters and reluctance to take them up."

=== American Indian Day ===
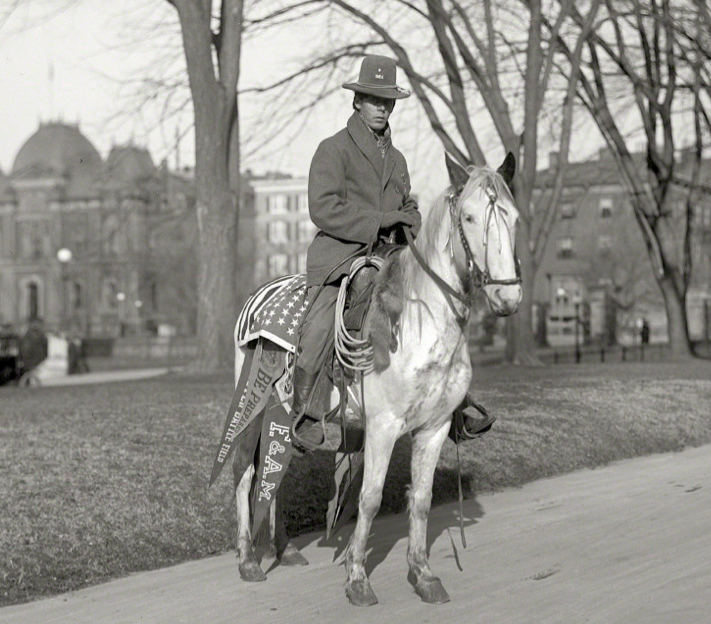
Red Fox James at White House, 1915

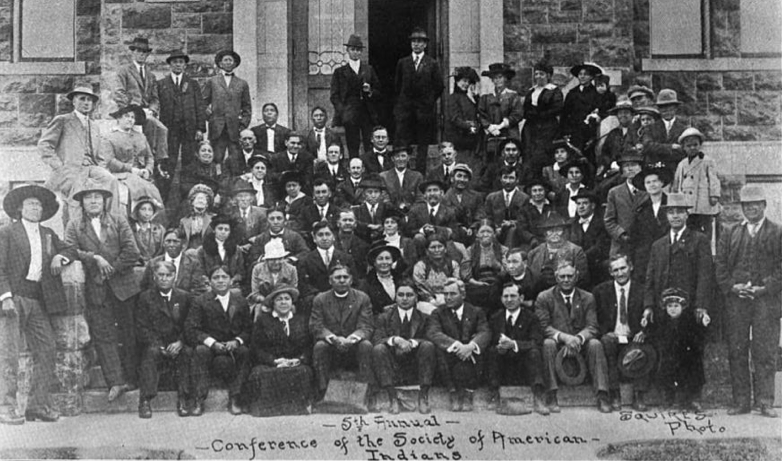
The Society of American Indians, 5th Annual Conference, Engineering Hall, Kansas University, October 1, 1915

The Society of American Indians was one of the first proponents of an "American Indian Day" in recognition for the significant contributions the first Americans made to the establishment and growth of the U.S. In 1915, Dr. Arthur C. Parker, a Seneca, and Director of the Rochester Museum and Science Center in Rochester, New York, persuaded the Boy Scouts of America to set aside a day for the "First Americans", and for three years they adopted such a day. In September 1915, the Society formally approved a plan concerning American Indian Day at the annual conference in Lawrence, Kansas, and Society President Rev. Sherman Coolidge appealed for recognition of American Indians as citizens and called upon the country to observe a national "American Indian Day". In response, the President issued a proclamation on September 28, 1915, which declared the second Saturday of each May as American Indian Day.

In 1916, the Governor Charles S. Whitman of New York declared the first official state American Indian Day on the second Saturday in May. The year before this proclamation was issued, Red Fox James (Blackfoot), a Society member, rode horseback from state to state seeking approval for a day to honor Indians. On December 14, 1915, he presented the endorsements of 24 state governments at the White House. There is no record, however, of such a national day being proclaimed. Today, several states celebrate the fourth Friday in September. In Illinois, for example, legislators enacted such a day in 1919. Presently, several states have designated Columbus Day as Native American Day, but it is observed without any recognition as a national legal holiday. In 1990. President George H. W. Bush approved a joint resolution designating November 1990 "National American Indian Heritage Month". Similar proclamations have been issued each year since 1994.

== Impact of World War I ==
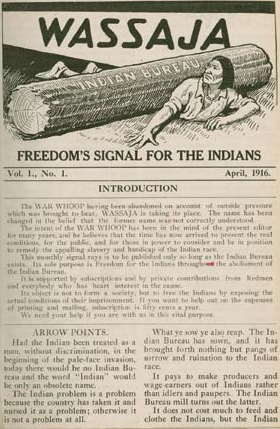
Wassaja, April 1916

As the threat of American involvement in a European war grew more ominous, the Indian reform movement was ebbing and the Society was racked by internal conflicts. In 1917, a controversy arose within the Society over a government proposal for a separate American Indian U.S. Army regiment. Supporters included Francis LaFlesche, Gertrude Simmons Bonnin, Carlos Montezuma, Father Gordon and Red Fox St. James. However, Parker and the editors of the journal opposed it, concluding Indians should not be segregated from other Americans. They noted that much of the clamor for a spectacular Indian regiment or battalion arose from the showman's brand of Indian as seen in Wild west shows. Debate continued on the abolition of reservation and the Bureau of Indian affairs, and the prohibition of the use of peyote in Indian religious ceremonies. From 1916 to 1922, Carlos Montezuma published his own monthly newsletter, Wassaja, for the "radical" reformist viewpoint. Arthur Parker, constantly attacked in Montezuma's Wassaja, sought to distance the journal from the Society and build a new organization. In response, Parker published the first issue of the American Indian Magazine in 1916, replacing Montezuma and Dennis Wheelock as contributing editors with Grace Wetherbee Coolidge, Rev. Sherman Coolidge's wife, and Mrs. S.A.R. Brown, both of whom were white. For the first time the direction of the Society's publication was not in Indian hands. Parker attacked "the peyote poison" and defenders Thomas L. Sloan, who represented peyote users in court, and anthropologists James Mooney and Francis LaFlesche. He also called upon Congress to dissolve tribes as legal entities and stressed the patriotism, loyalty and numbers of American Indians serving with the allies. The final issue of the American Indian Magazine for 1917 was a special edition on the Sioux people, attributed to Gertrude Simmons Bonnin's Sioux patriotism and her effort to enlist the renewed interest of Charles Eastman in the Society. As Parker devoted less time to the Society, Bonnin gave more. The American Indian Magazine was published for another three years, and the last issue was August 1920. The American Indian Tepee, started in 1920 by Red Fox St. James' Tepee Order, became for a time an unofficial organ of the Society. It staunchly but unsuccessfully supported Society President Thomas L. Sloan for the post of U.S. Indian Commissioner and reported Society news, including the St. Louis conference.

== Peyote religion ==
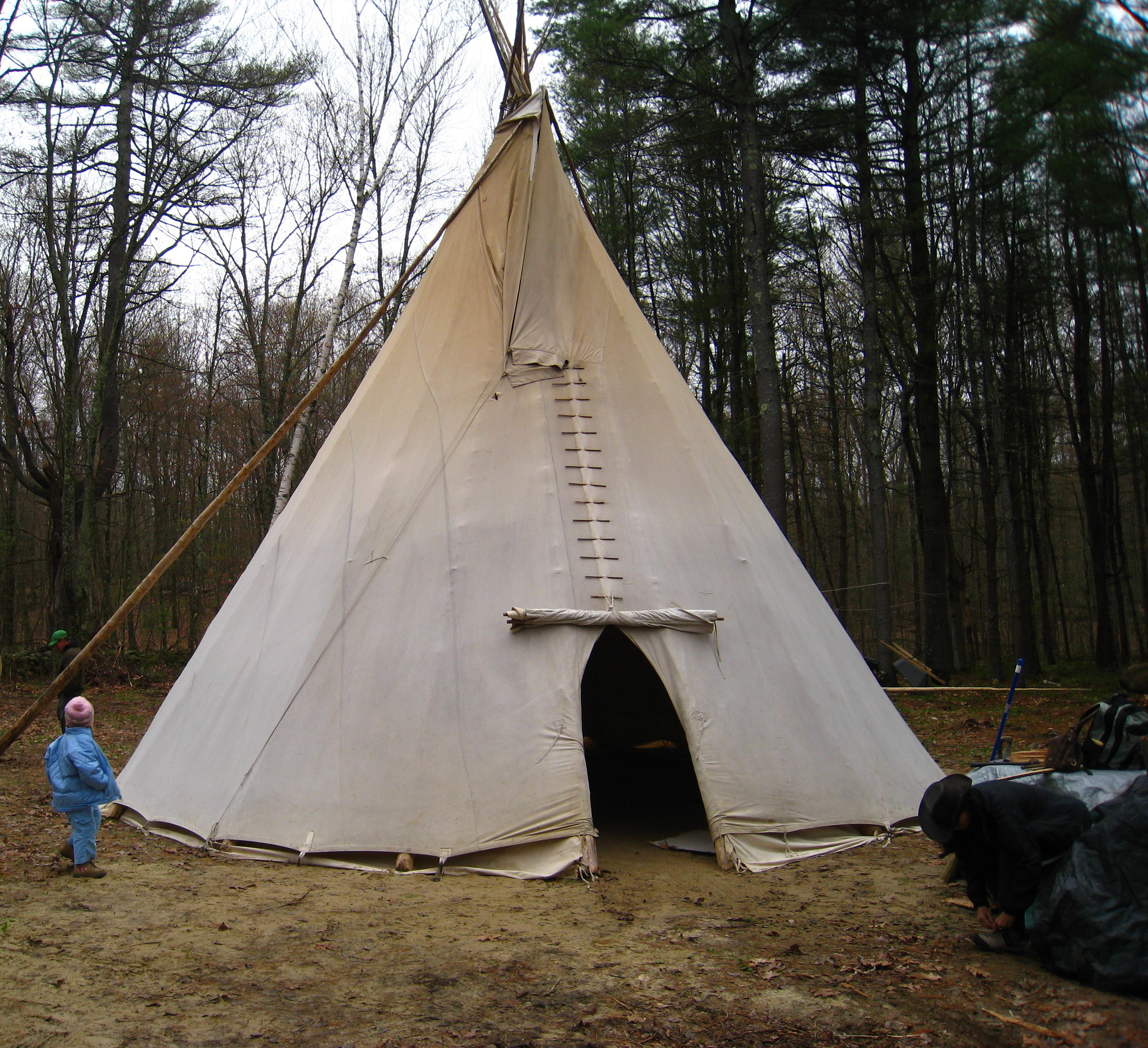
Peyote ceremony tipi

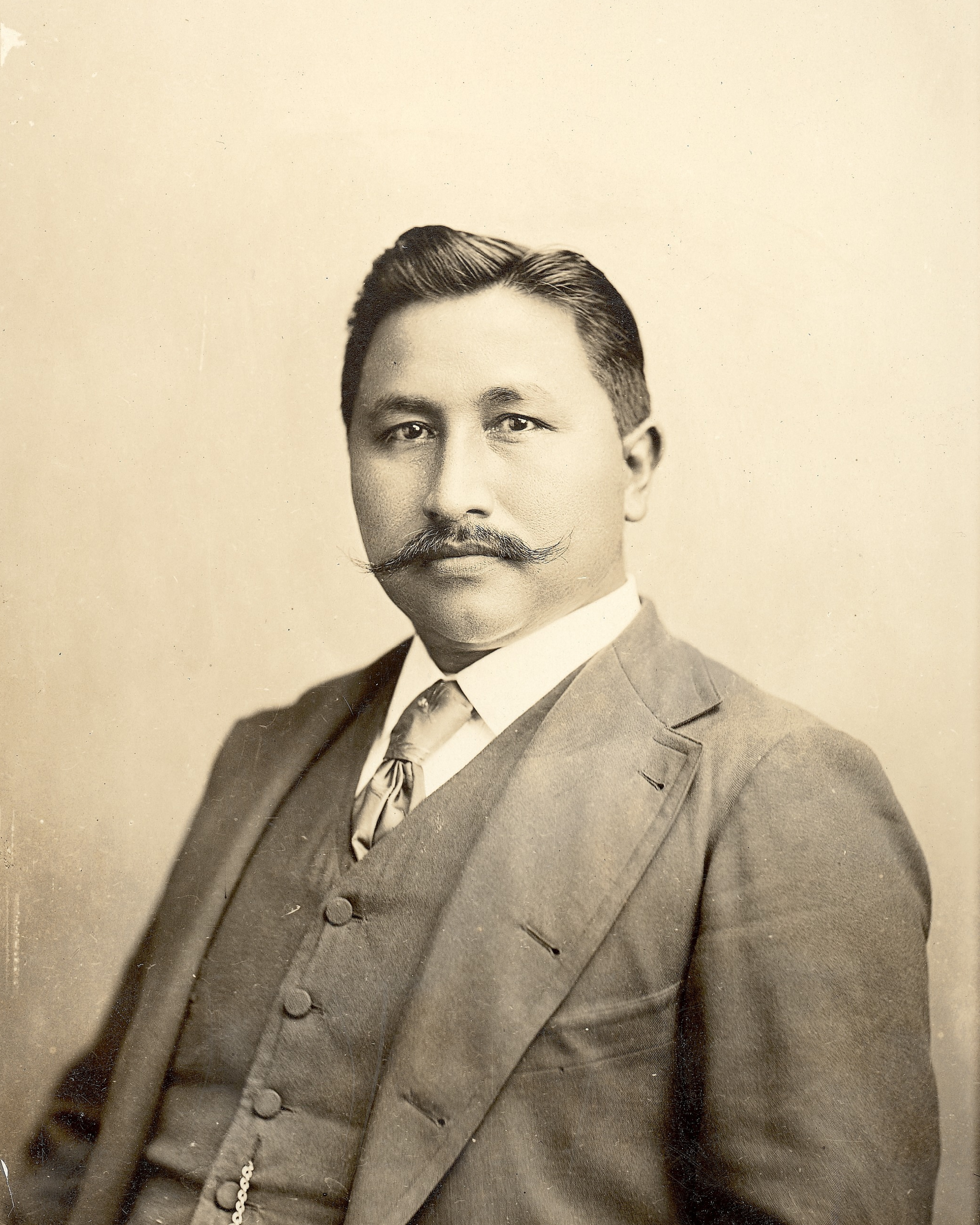
Francis La Flesche, first Native American anthropologist, Smithsonian Institution

Peyotism was topic of constant and divisive debate within the Society. In the 1870s, a new religion based on the ritual consumption of peyote formed on the reservations of southwestern Indian Territory, present Oklahoma. Peyotism drew upon earlier ceremonies from northern Mexico and traditional theologies from the southern Plains cultures. In the early 1880s, the ceremony, ritual instruments and core doctrine of the modern peyote religion became more uniform and the religion spread to other tribes throughout Indian Territory. By 1907 statehood, Peyotism's spread to the majority of Oklahoma tribes had been greatly facilitated by established patterns of intertribal visiting and intermarriage.

In February and March 1918, prominent Society leaders argued both sides of the peyote issue before the U.S. Congress House Subcommittee on Indian Affairs on the "Hayden Bill", legislation proposed by Congressman Carl Hayden from Arizona to suppress liquor and peyote among Indians. Testimony against the use of peyote was given by Gertrude Simmons Bonnin and Charles Eastman, while supporters the peyote religion included Thomas L. Sloan, Francis LaFlesche, Cleaver Warden and Paul Boynton. (Note: The Hayden Bill was passed by the House, but it was never enacted into law.) In response to the Congressional hearings on the Hayden Bill, Carlisle Indian School alumni and other progressive leaders founded the Native American Church of Oklahoma in October 1918. Society lawyers Sloan and Hiram Chase asserted that the peyote religion was an "Indian religion" or the "Indian version of Christianity" and entitled to the Constitutional right to religious freedom. The Native American Church combined Indian and Christian elements, and was popular among the best-educated and most acculturated men among the Winnebago, Omaha and other tribes. Henry Roe Cloud, a Winnebago, acknowledged the peyote religion attracted the best-educated and ablest men in his tribe, but personally opposed the use. Oliver Lemere, a former Carlisle student who served as treasurer of the Church, was attracted to the religion because of its mixture of Christianity and Winnebago customs, and that its adherents came from the progressive wing of the tribe. By 1934, the Native American Church of Oklahoma was the most important Pan-Indian religious movement in the United States, and church leadership founded affiliated churches in other states. The 1918 and the 1934 charters had the same incorporators, evidencing a continuity of Carlisle alumni leadership in Pan-Indianism. (Note: In 1934, the Ned Brace was president, and Frank Cayou vice-president.) (Note: The white anthropologist J. Sydney Slotkin's book, "The Peyote Religion", was written essentially as a manual for the Native American Church. Slotkin was an official of the church and edited its Quarterly Bulletin.) In 1945, the Native American Church in Oklahoma was incorporated as "The Native American Church of United States."

== Last Society meeting – 1923 ==
In 1923, the organization met in Chicago. By this time, the Society was almost completely inactive and differences regarding the Bureau of Indian Affairs and the Peyote religion had alienated most of the leadership. The invitation to meet in that city was issued by Carlos Montezuma, but by the time it was necessary to begin planning, Montezuma was mortally ill and decided to go back to the reservation to die. He and his wife left Chicago shortly thereafter for the Fort McDowell Yavapai Reservation in Arizona, where he died on January 31, 1923, in a primitive hut on the reservation. After so many years of asserting he would not "go back," he did indeed "go back." Montezuma was deeply committed to Pan-Indianism, but he chose to die a Yavapai. Thomas L. Sloan, accompanied by Society colleagues, visited Chicago Bar Association and tempted to drum up interest in Indian affairs. But the meeting in Chicago was overshadowed by the Indian encampment held in connection with the conference in the forest preserve near the city. Thousands of Chicagoans journeyed to the camp to see the Indians "informal gala" and watch Indian dances and ceremonials. The public was much more interested in the exotic Indian past than the reality of the Indian present. William Madison, a Minnesota Chippewa who was treasurer of the Society, "expressed his regrets that it is only when he exhibits Indian war dances in ancient ceremonies that the public evinces any interest in the Indian." At the conclusion of the inauspicious meeting, after years of diminished participation, the Society disbanded with little fanfare after a thirteenth convention was held in Chicago. (Note: In reality, it was the twelfth convention, as the seventh in 1917 never took place.) While the Society lacked the internal consensus necessary to fulfill its visionary role, former Society leaders would assume influential roles in the American Indian Defense Association, the Committee of One Hundred and the Meriam Report.

== Society leadership in Indian affairs ==
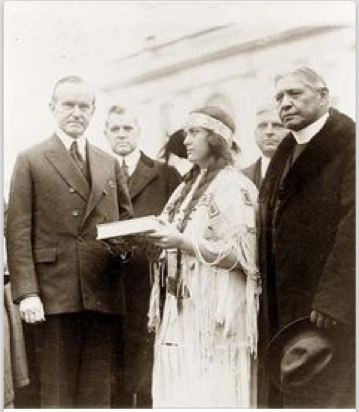
President Calvin Coolidge presented with a book written by G. E. E. Linquist titled "The Red Man In The United States" (1919). Ruth Muskrat Bronson (center) making the presentation on behalf of "The Committee of One Hundred" with Rev. Sherman Coolidge (right), December, 1923.

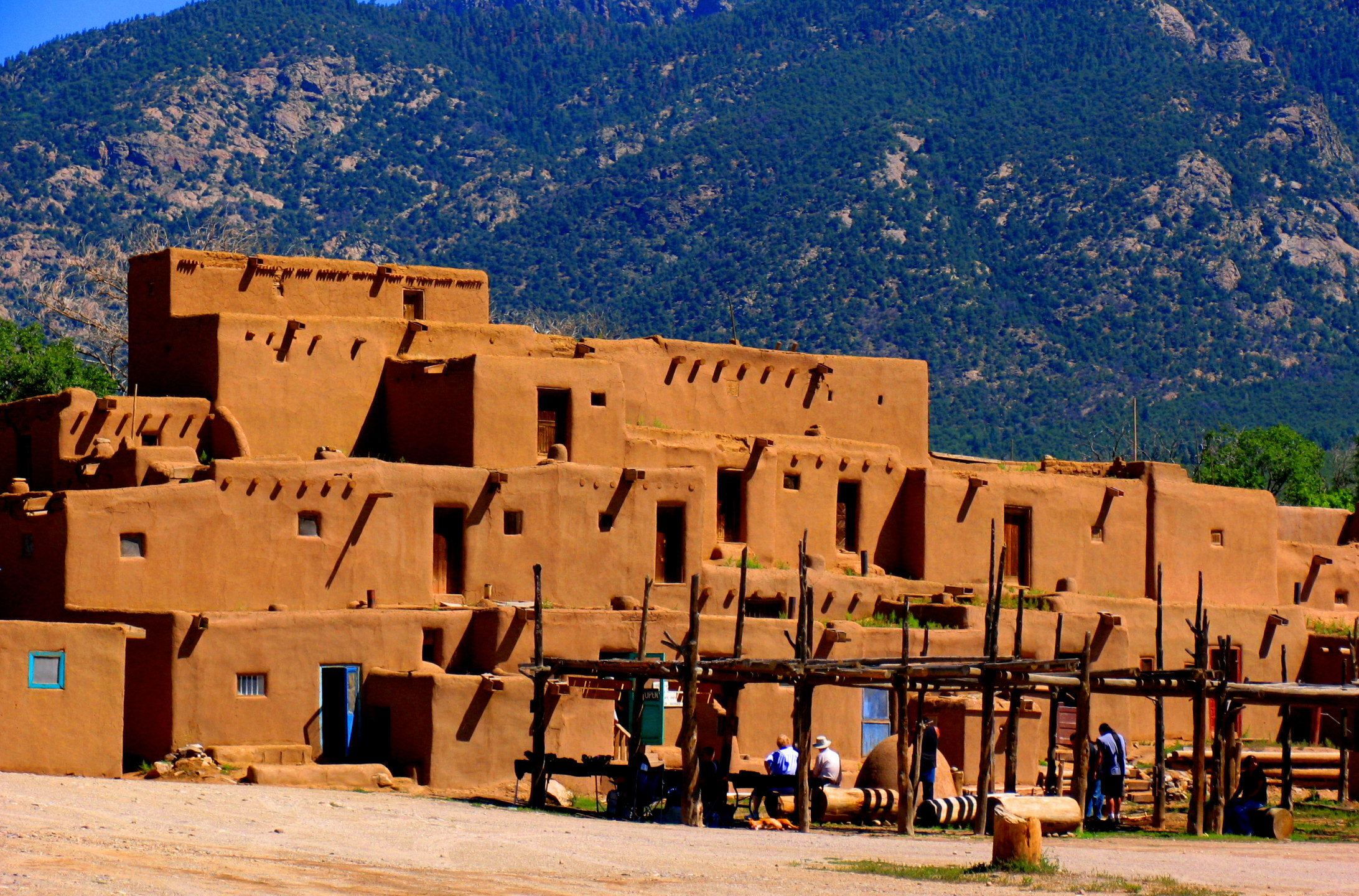
Taos Pueblo, New Mexico

While the Society disbanded in the fall of 1923, the leadership continued to influence Indian affairs. In May 1923, Society leaders joined with reformer John Collier and founded the American Indian Defense Association in response to the injustices forced upon the Pueblos of New Mexico by the Bursum Bill (1921) and the Dance Order (1923). In 1921, Senator Holm O. Bursum of New Mexico introduced a bill whose effect would have been to divest the Pueblos of large portions of their lands in favor of squatters. By 1922, Secretary of the Interior Albert B. Fall strongly supported the "Bursum Bill". By 1923, the plight of Pueblos in New Mexico evoked widespread public sympathy emerged as the symbol of the injustices forced upon American Indian. The Pueblos of New Mexico maintained a strong internal cohesion as self-governing societies for hundreds of years. Each Pueblo owned lands communally and unconditionally under grants from the King of Spain later confirmed by the United States Congress. Also in 1923, Commissioner Charles H. Burke of Indian Affairs issued a "Dance Order", also known as the "Leavitt Bill", directing superintendents to discourage the "giveaways" which were part of the ceremonials of a number of tribes, as well as to any dances the agent deemed immoral, indecent or dangerous. The Dance Order was issued in response to lobbying by the Indian Rights Association and missionaries who were opposed to the growing influence of the Peyote religion, and threatened to remove the right of Pueblo Indians to perform their traditional dances and ceremonies in New Mexico. The American Indian Defense Association became a powerful new lobby in Washington and successfully challenged government confiscation of communal Indian lands and restriction of religious freedom, and the Bursum Bill was defeated and the Dance Order withdrawn.

In 1923, in the wake of the American Indian Defense Association's momentum to check and reverse the policy of the Dawes Act, Secretary of the Interior Hubert Work invited an eminent group of Americans to form the "Advisory Council on Indian Affairs", which became known as the "Committee of One Hundred", to review and advise on Indian policy. The group consisted of some of the most distinguished men and women in public life including Bernard M. Baruch, Nicholas Murray Butler, William Jennings Bryan, David Starr Jordan, Gen. John J. Pershing, Mark Sullivan, Roy Lyman Wilbur, William Allen White and Oswald Garrison Villard. Also included were John Collier of the American Indian Defense Association and M.K. Sniffen of the Indian Rights Association. On December 12 and 13, 1923, the Committee of One-Hundred met in Washington, D.C. Former Society leadership was well represented by Rev. Sherman Coolidge, Arthur C. Parker, Dennison Wheelock, Charles Eastman, Thomas L. Sloan, Father Philip B. Gordon, Henry Roe Cloud J.N.B. Hewitt and Fayette Avery McKenzie. Parker and McKenzie and teamed once again, and Parker was selected to preside over the Committee sessions and McKenzie chairman of the resolutions subcommittee. McKenzie observed, "It would be interesting to compare the platform of this conference with the positions taken in earlier years by the Society. In general it was a summarization of those positions, but in more general terms."

In 1926, recommendations by the committee prompted the Coolidge administration to commission Lewis M. Meriam and the Brookings Institution to conduct a two-year study of the overall condition of Indians in the United States. Henry Roe Cloud and Fayette McKenzie were significant contributors to the Brookings Institution study. In February 1928, findings and recommendations of "The Problem of Indian Administration", known as the Meriam Report, were published. The Meriam Report documented the failures of federal Indian policies and how they had contributed to severe problems with Indian education, health and poverty. The Meriam Report marked an ideological shift in American Indian policy and laid the foundation for the Indian New Deal under the leadership of John Collier as Commissioner of the Bureau of Indian Affairs during the administration of President Franklin Delano Roosevelt.

== Legacy ==
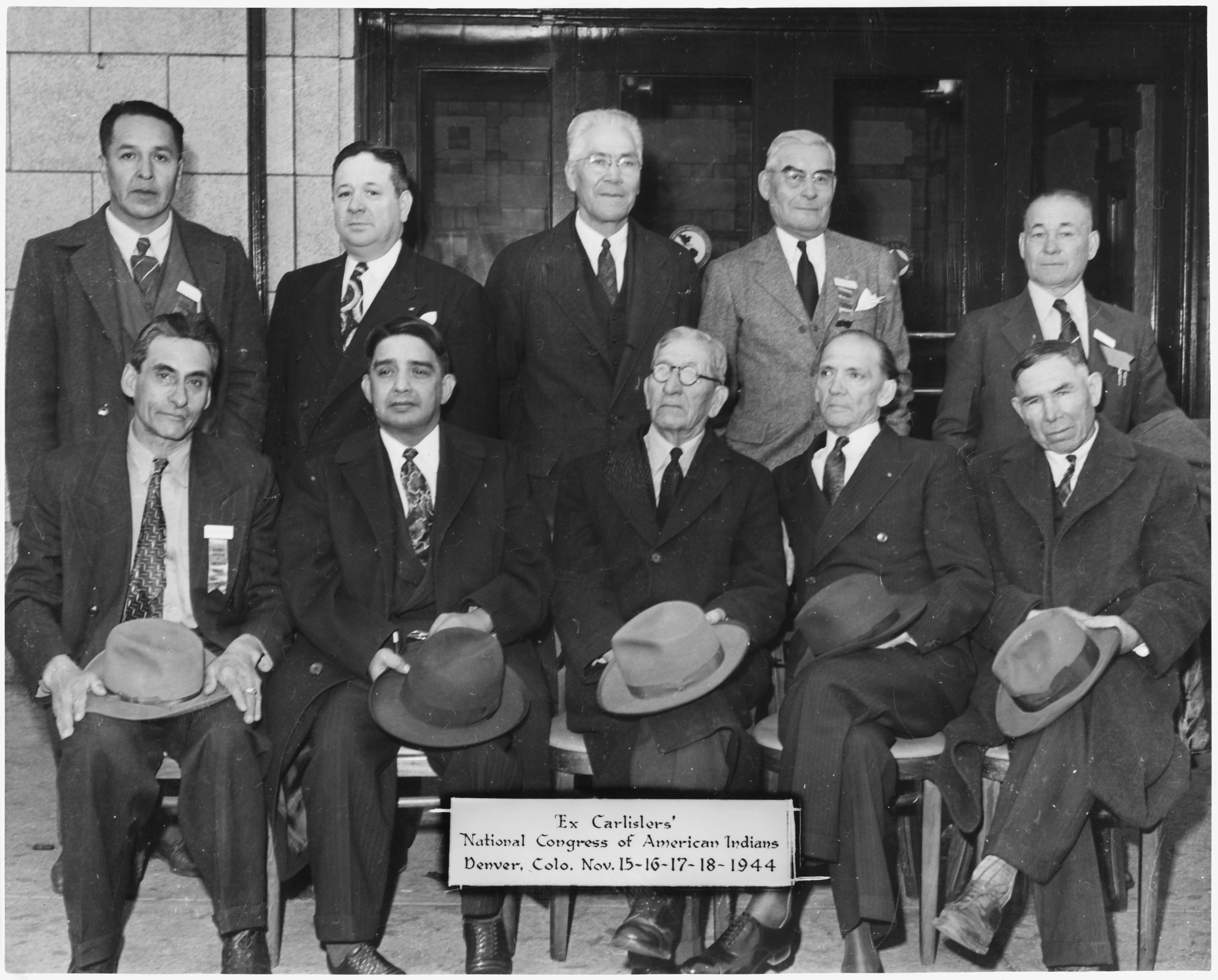
Carlisle alumni, founding conference of the National Congress of American Indians, 1944

The Society of American Indians was the first national American Indian rights organization run by and for American Indians and pioneered twentieth century Pan-Indianism. The Society was a twentieth century forum for a new generation of American Indian leaders. The Society's Denver Platform of 1914 called for Indian citizenship and opening the United States Court of Claims to all tribes and bands in United States. Former Society leaders continued to influence Indian affairs serving with the American Indian Defense Association, the Committee of One Hundred and authoring the Meriam Report of 1928. The Society was the forerunner of modern American Indian organizations.

In 1944, the founding conference of the National Congress of American Indians much resembled the founding conference of the Society of American Indians in 1911. Members of the Congress were prominent educated professionals and intellectuals from the fields of medicine, nursing, law, government, education, anthropology and clergy. Many had attended the Carlisle Indian School or Haskell Institute and were college graduates. The first president was Judge Napoleon B. Johnson of Oklahoma, a college graduate and a Freemason. The first secretary, Dan M. Madrano, was educated at Carlisle as well as the Wharton School of Business and the National Law School (not related to the namesake Indian school), and a Freemason. The council included the anthropologist D'Arcy McNickle, a field representative from the Indian Office. Arthur C. Parker and Henry Standing Bear made brief appearances as elder statesman. As within the Society, the Congress debated whether Indian Bureau employees could hold elective or appointive office in the organization and decided they could. The Congress dealt with long-familiar subjects, legal aid, legislative action, education and establishing a publication. The Congress "would confine itself to the broad problems confronting the total Indian population or large segments of it. "Like the Society, the new organization hoped to avoid involvement in partisan or local squabbles and the consequent dilution of its broad representative character." Initially, membership of the Congress was restricted to persons "of Indian ancestry" and was both individual and group, with appropriate safeguards reminiscent of the Society's. Later the familiar pattern of nonvoting non-Indian associates emerged with the provision for individual and organizational affiliation. Today, the Congress continues to be the most important Pan-Indian reform group, and non-natives continue to be drawn from the same groups as the Society; church groups, progressives and social scientists.

== Society's 100th Year Symposium at Ohio State University ==
In 2011, the American Indian Studies Program (AIS) of the Ohio State University celebrated the 100th anniversary of the founding of the Society of American Indians. Scholars from around the country attended Columbus Day weekend. (Note: Topics workshops on a variety of topics including Rhetoric and Reality of American Indian Citizenship; Boarding School Generations; and, Well-Known Society Figures and Native American Languages: Past, Present, and Future Tense. The symposium also included a performance by American Indian performer, and recipient of the Lifetime Achievement Award from the Native Writers' Circle of the Americas, Joy Harjo. Harjo is part of the President and Provost's Diversity Lecture and Cultural Arts Series.) Keynote addresses were delivered prominent American Indian scholars Philip J. Deloria (University of Michigan), K. Tsianina Lomawaima (University of Arizona) and Robert Warrior (University of Illinois) (Note: Deloria has a familial connection to the Society since his great-grandfather, also named Philip J. Deloria, was present at the 1911 conference. His great-grandfather was one of the first Dakota Sioux people to be ordained a minister in the Episcopal Church and during the symposium, preached to 1911 participants. Deloria has authored books on American Indian customs, culture, experiences, and history. He is currently a professor at the University of Michigan in both the Program in American Culture and the Department of History.) In keeping with the tradition of the Society's first national meeting, the symposium included a trip to the Newark Earthworks in Newark and Heath, Ohio. Built by the indigenous people of the Americas, the Newark Earthworks is 2,000 years old and served as a place of ceremony, astronomical observation, social gathering, trade and worship.

== See also ==
- Category:Members of the Society of American Indians
- Pan-Indianism
- List of Native American firsts
- Association on American Indian Affairs
- National Congress of American Indians
- American Indian Movement
- Red Power Movement
- Native American Renaissance
- Nipo T. Strongheart
