= Estaiene M. DePeltquestangue =

American nurse

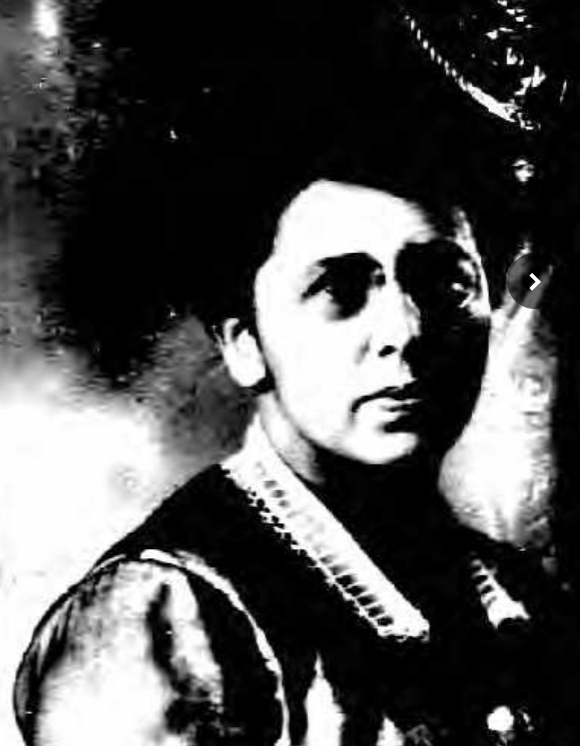
- Estaiene DePeltquestangue, from her 1921 passport application
- Born: February 19, 1879; Charlevoix, Michigan
- Died: September 30, 1961 (aged 82); Massillon, Ohio
- Occupations: Nurse, activist, clubwoman

Estaiene M. DePeltquestangue (February 19, 1879 – September 30, 1961) was an American nurse. She was a member of the Kickapoo people and served on the executive council of the Society of American Indians.

== Early life and education ==
Estaiene M. DePeltquestangue was born in Charlevoix, Michigan, or possibly France. Both of her parents died when she was a young girl. She was a graduate of the Carlisle Indian Industrial School, which she attended from 1897 to 1902. She pursued further training as a nurse, and graduated from the Lakeside Hospital Training School in Ohio in 1908.

== Career ==
DePeltquestangue taught briefly at the Carlisle Indian School after she graduated. She became supervisor of probationers at Lakeside Hospital in Cleveland, Ohio, and was hired as superintendent for the new Massillon City Hospital in 1909. DePeltquestangue worked as a nurse in New York City, and worked as a private nurse in Ohio, to lawyer Frank Baldwin and his wife, Annie S. Baldwin from 1911 to 1930.

DePeltquestangue served on the executive council of the Society of American Indians, as vice-president for membership in 1915. She attended the annual meetings of the Society in Lawrence, Kansas, spoke on panels, and presented papers. In 1915, she gave a paper, "Indian Nurses and Nursing Indians", at the International Convention of Trained Nurses in San Francisco. It was reprinted in several publications, including The British Journal of Nursing. "The salvation of any people must come from within," she wrote. "We need people of personality, tact, and unquestionable integrity; we need men and women of the wide-awake helpful type, to whom religion means something infinitely above creed; we need men and women who have the courage of their convictions, wisdom that begets trust, and the ability to generate enthusiasm; we need people who revive the old fighting spirit and directed it into useful channels."

She traveled abroad in 1922, visiting much of Europe, Turkey, Palestine, Egypt and Algeria. When Annie S. Baldwin died in 1930, she left a trust fund of $50,000 for DePeltquestangue, in gratitude for her years with the Baldwins. She was a clubwoman in Massillon in her later years, active with church women's groups, the Burroughs Nature Club, the Nimble Thimble Club, and the Saturday Whist Club. In 1937, she was secretary of the Board of Lady Managers at Massillon City Hospital. In 1943, she donated letters, clippings, and autographs related to president William McKinley to the historical museum in Massillon, Ohio.

== Personal life ==
DePeltquestangue was close to her niece, Jane Virginia Klosky Copthorne. She also mentored a fellow Carlisle Indian School graduate, Louise Bluesky. She died at a hospital in Massillon, Ohio in 1961, aged 82 years. The Massillon Museum has a collection of her papers.
