= Marie Louise Bottineau Baldwin =

American lawyer (1863–1952)

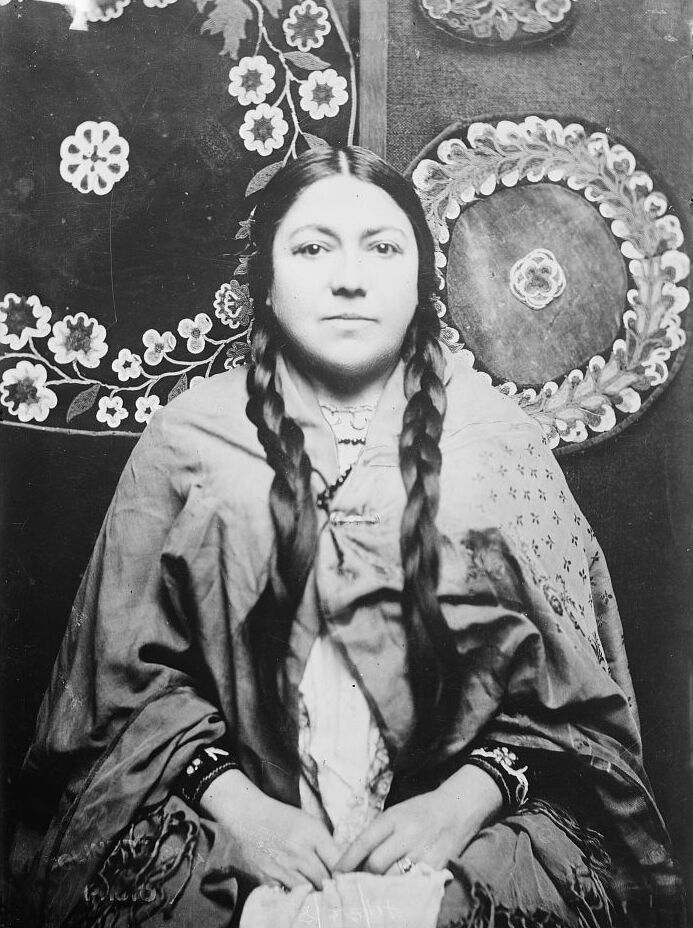
- Marie L. Baldwin
- Born: December 14, 1863; Pembina, North Dakota
- Died: May 17, 1952 (aged 88); Los Angeles, California
- Occupations: Attorney, accountant, linguist
- Employer(s): United States Bureau of Indian Affairs, Education Division
- Known for: First Native American student and first Native descent woman to graduate from the Washington College of Law
- Parent(s): John (Jean Baptiste) Bottineau, Marguerite Renville (b. Jan. 13, 1842 at Pembina)
- Relatives: Grandparents, Pierre Bottineau and Genevieve "Jennie" LaRence, b. 1818, François Renville and Marguerite Dumas Belgarde; sisters, Lillian, b. 1867 and Alvina Clement, b. 1868

Marie Louise Bottineau Baldwin (December 14, 1863 – May 17, 1952), was a Turtle Mountain Ojibwe attorney, Native American rights activist, and suffragist. In 1914, Baldwin was the first Native American student to graduate from the Washington College of Law. She worked in the United States Bureau of Indian Affairs, and was an officer in the Society of American Indians.

== Family and education ==
Baldwin's paternal grandfather was the Ojibwe (Chippewa)-French-Canadian explorer Pierre Bottineau. Her paternal grandmother was Pierre's first wife, Genevieve "Jennie" LaRence. Her father, Jean Baptiste Bottineau, was the second of Pierre and Jennie's nine children. He became a lawyer and advocate for the Ojibwe (Chippewa) Nation in Minnesota and North Dakota. Her mother was Marie Renville Bottineau.

Marie Bottineau was born December 14, 1863, on Ojibwe land, which would later become part of North Dakota. She had one sister named Lillian and another sister who died in infancy named Alvina Clementa. She was proud of her mixed heritage and, as an adult, considered herself a "French Indian" or a "French Chippewa." In 1867, Marie moved with her family to Minnesota where she attended public schools and St. Joseph's Academy. She would also spend time at St. John's Ladies College in Winnipeg, Canada. Later in life, in 1912, she would enroll at the Washington College of Law, where she completed a three-year course of study in just two years. She was the first Native American and the first woman of color to earn a degree from the college.

At age 24, Marie Bottineau married a white businessman named Fred S. Baldwin but the marriage only lasted a couple of years.

== Native American advocacy ==
Bottineau Baldwin dedicated much of her life's work to Native American advocacy. In the 1890s, she moved to Washington, D.C., with her father to defend the territorial rights of the Turtle Mountain Ojibwe against the Federal government. In 1904, after Congress settled the claims, Bottineeau Baldwin accepted an appointment from President Theodore Roosevelt to serve as a clerk in the Office of Indian Affairs (OIA) and was charged with overseeing government contracts to the reservations. She was one of only two Native people employed in the Washington office at the time. Bottineau Baldwin would work for the OIA until she retired in 1932.

Bottineau Baldwin also became an early and active member of the Society of American Indians (SAI), an advocacy organization founded in 1911. In 1914, while serving on the SAI's Executive Council, Bottineau Baldwin took part in a delegation to President Woodrow Wilson, presenting a memorial that challenged the wardship status of many Native peoples. At a banquet after the White House meeting, Bottineau Baldwin delivered a speech titled, "What an Indian Woman Has to Say for her Race." In 1915, Bottineau Baldwin was elected treasurer of the SAI, but soon thereafter she began to feel marginalized and attacked by other leaders of the organization, including Gertrude Simmons Bonnin, who questioned the loyalty of Native employees of the federal Indian Service. The tensions within the SAI which cumulated in a series of conflicts and loss of friendships leading to Baldwin withdrawing from the organization and the national scene of Native activism in 1919.

After graduation, Bottineau Baldwin was an influential speaker for the Society of American Indians. Her topics were primarily how the identity of Native Americans progressed into modern times. As one of the few employed Native women working for Washington's federal government and as a lawyer, Bottineau Baldwin drew media attention.

== Suffrage advocacy ==
Bottineau Baldwin was involved in women's suffrage efforts in North Dakota. In 1913, she also marched in Washington D.C., as part of the national Woman Suffrage Procession. Rather than creating a float in mythical tribute to Native American women, as parade organizers suggested, she chose to march as a modern indigenous woman with fellow lawyers and suffragists. Bottineau Baldwin also attended the Lake Mohonk Conferences in 1909, 1910, and 1912 to represent the Office of Indian Affairs. There, Bottineau Baldwin engaged in public policy with leaders from different communities. As one of the few indigenous representatives, Bottineau Baldwin helped challenge the "squaw drudge" stereotype Anglo-Americans held of Native Americans. During her time at Washington College of Law, Bottineau Baldwin became interested in the suffrage movement by actively attending conferences for the Office of Indian Affairs and engaging in "mainstream feminist conversations."

On her graduation day, from Washington College of Law, a journalist questioned Bottineau Baldwin, asking whether she considered herself a suffragist. In response, she laughed at the comment and said, "Did you ever know that the Indian women were among the first suffragists and that they exercised the right of recall" Bottineau Baldwin prided herself in educating the public about indigenous heritage, including in relation to women's rights.

== Public persona ==
Bottineau Baldwin initially supported the assimilation of Native Americans into non-Native culture. However, she also heavily embraced her indigenous culture as part of her identity throughout her public engagements. Attending law school as the only female Native student, Bottineau Baldwin understood the importance of being understood and respected if she was to be able to be heard. As an attorney and employee for the Office of Indian Affairs, Bottineau Baldwin chose to submit a photo of herself in Native clothing instead of her usual modern apparel for her federal profile. She made a radical choice in indigenizing her federal record. Bottineau Baldwin actively rejected the notion of assimilation that the agency emphasized. The portrait encapsulates Baldwin as a woman asserting her indigenous identity while working for the federal government. In her public appearances, Bottineau Baldwin inspired indigenous community members as she educated the populace to move past defamatory stereotypes about Native Americans. From 1910 to 1912 she was invited as a formal speaker at graduation ceremonies funded by the Office of Indian Affairs. The Office of Indian Affairs funded her travels because they believed Bottineau Baldwin's presence as a "successful Native woman" would impress graduates. Bottineau Baldwin's traditional Ojibwa attire helped convey a "modern Indian identity" as she made public appearances and worked with the Society of American Indians.

Bottineau Baldwin strategically promoted her political agenda while doing public appearances. She grabbed media attention because of "public fascination" with her cultural presence.

== Death and legacy ==
Bottineau Baldwin moved to Los Angeles in 1949. She died there from a stroke in 1952 and was buried in Forest Lawn Memorial Park. A Marie Bottineau Baldwin Scholarship was established by the Washington College of Law student organization. In 2020, during the centennial commemoration of the ratification of the Nineteenth Amendment, the journal Minnesota History called for more public recognition of Marie Louise Bottineau Baldwin and other Native suffragists.
