= Fayette Avery McKenzie =

American sociologist and University president

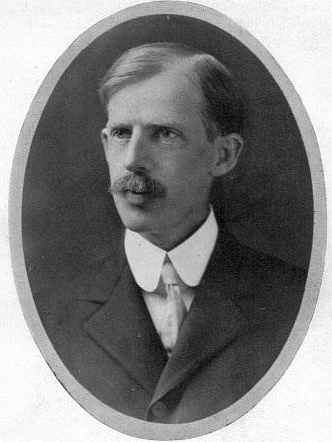
- Born: July 31, 1872; Montrose, Susquehanna County, Pennsylvania, United States
- Died: September 1, 1957 (aged 85); Huntingdon, Pennsylvania, United States
- Education: Lehigh University, University of Pennsylvania
- Occupation(s): Educator, university president, advocate for Native Americans
- Years active: 1895–1957
- Known for: President of Fisk University (1915–1925), founder of the Society of American Indians
- Notable work: The American Indian in Relation to the White Population of the United States
- Spouse: Nettie Evalyn Tressel McKenzie

Fayette Avery McKenzie (July 31, 1872–September 1, 1957) was an American educator and president of Fisk University from 1915 to 1925. He received his doctorate degree from the University of Pennsylvania in 1908. His dissertation, The American Indian in Relation to the White Population of the United States was published. He taught and studied Native Americans and was one of the founders of the Society of American Indians.

== Early life and education ==
Fayette Avery McKenzie was born in Montrose, Susquehanna County, Pennsylvania, on July 31, 1872, to Gertrude Avery, daughter of Charles Avery, and Edwin McKenzie, son of Benajah McKenzie. Edwin was a merchant. Fayette lived in Montrose and attended public schools there until his senior year of high school. The family moved to South Bethlehem, Pennsylvania, and he graduated from high school there.

McKenzie enrolled in Lehigh University in 1891. He studied at the University of Pennsylvania during the summer of 1894. He graduated from Lehigh in 1895 with a Bachelors degree; he was a member of Phi Beta Kappa. From 1900 to 1903, he attended the University of Pennsylvania, where he studied economics, history, and sociology. He earned a PhD from University of Pennsylvania in 1908. His dissertation, The American Indian in Relation to the White Population of the United States was published.

== Career ==
=== Educator ===
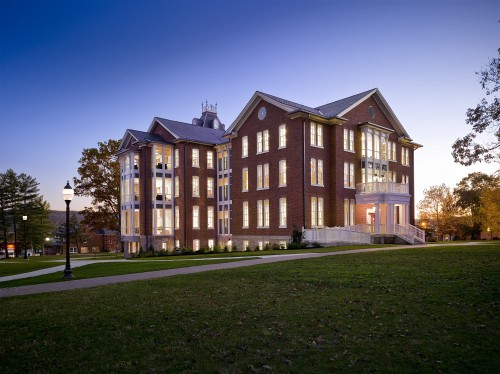
Juniata College, Huntingdon, Pennsylvania

For the first two years after attaining his degree, he tutored families of railroad employees of the Lehigh Valley Railroad and Pennsylvania Railroad. In 1897, he taught economics, history, English, and German and French languages at Juniata College.

While taking college courses from 1900 to 1903, he also taught mathematics and modern languages at the Blight School for Boys. He moved to Columbus, Ohio, by 1905 to be a professor at Ohio State University. He taught sociology and economics through 1914.

He went to France in 1914 and studied and traveled with Professor Compte, who spent the summers in the French countryside with his family.

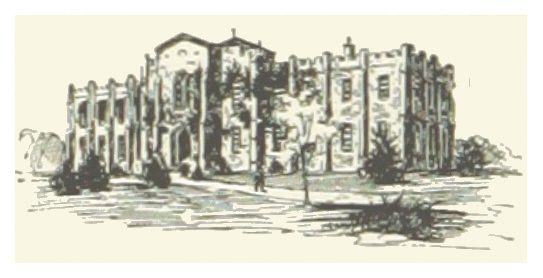
Fisk University, Nashville, Tennessee

For ten years, from 1915 to 1925, he was the president of Fisk University. Under his leadership, the school received recognition as a standard college. It was the first African American school to do so in the United States. He raised a million dollar endowment fund for the school.

While raising funds for Fisk University, donors said "they wanted Fisk students to be taught their place under Jim Crow" according to Nov Dec 2023 issue of the Pennsylvania Gazette, a publication of the University of Pennsylvania. And, according to that article, McKenzie closed the student newspaper, abolished the student council, banned most extracurricular activities, and imposed strict codes. Students who violated these restrictions were labeled Bolshevists and expelled. W. E. B. Du Bois wrote in The Crisis (the NAACP magazine) "Men and women of Black America: Let no decent Negro send his child to Fisk until Fayette McKenzie goes". Student unrest in 1925 led to demonstrations against McKenzie. In February 1926, students went on strike, and 80 percent of students left campus and returned home. McKenzie refused to make changes in university regulations. Finally, under pressure, he submitted his resignation on April 16, 1926. This was, clearly, one of the worst administrations in HBCU history.

He returned to Juniata College in 1927 to teach sociology and function for two years as the dean of men. He started the Altoona Center as an Extension of the college in 1928. He retired in 1941.

=== Direct efforts with Native Americans ===
McKenzie had educated, studied, and lived among Native Americans in the Western United States. During that time, he came to understand the injustices of forced relations and other actions taken by the United States government. He was the first American sociologist to specialize in Indian affairs and he fought against stereotypical norms against them.

Between 1900 and 1903, he taught at the boarding school on the Wind River Indian Reservation in Wyoming. During a trip to France in 1914, World War I commenced. Upon returning to the United States, Fayette made a study of the education of Native Americans in the western United States. In 1926 and 1927, after a year in France, he traveled to Washington, D.C., and a number of Indian reservations. He was hired by the Institute for Government Research to study problems of Native Americans.

=== Society of American Indians ===
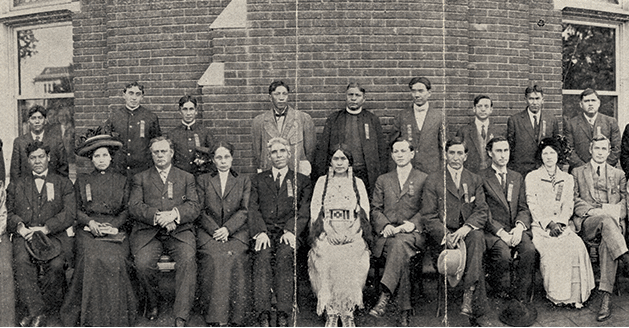
Society of American Indians, 1911.

In 1911, he was a European-American co-founder and a leader of the Society of American Indians (SOI), which was formed at Ohio State University. He was a professor there from 1905 to 1914. McKenzie, who encouraged the growth of the organization to one that was one that was operated by Native Americans, invited six Native American intellectuals—professionals, activists, clergy, speakers, writers, and entertainers—to a meeting at Ohio State University in April 1911. The attendees of the first annual conference included Dr. Charles Eastman (Santee Dakota), physician; Dr. Carlos Montezuma, (Yavapai-Apache), physician; Thomas L. Sloan, (Omaha), attorney; Charles Edwin Dagenett, (Peoria), Bureau of Indian Affairs supervisor; Laura Cornelius Kellogg, (Oneida), educator; and Henry Standing Bear (Oglala Lakota), educator. There were also representatives of the offices of the National Office of Indian Affairs, Ohio governor, Columbus mayor, and the university.

The group founded the American Indian Association. Later renamed the Society of American Indians it was created to fight against restrictive governmental policies against Native Americans. At that time, Native Americans were pushed out of tribal territories, having to manage "unrelenting waves of immigration, settlement and urbanizations, [and] technological change," according to Marti Chaatsmith, a Native American sociologist. People were in significant distress due to discrimination, exploitation, disease, and extreme poverty.

For the period between 1911 and 1923, SOI conducted annual conferences; networked with allies, critics, and reformers; lobbied the Office of Indian Affairs (OIA) and Congress; offered legal assistance to Native individuals; and published a journal. It sought to “bring together all progressive Indians and friends of Indian progress for the purpose of promoting the highest interests of the race and the individual." To do so meant to appreciate time-honored cultural traditions, except those practices that kept Native Americans from succeeding in a modern world. It sought to ensure equal rights and opportunities as those afforded to the whites.

The society was challenged, though, by the number of varying cultures of Native American peoples across the country, as they tried to negotiate unified goals and positions. The organization dissolved in 1923, but one year later the Native Americans received birthright citizenship in the United States with the Indian Citizenship Act, tempered by continued wardship status. The Indian Claims Commission was created in 1946 to mediate claims out of court that could result in monetary damages. They could not regain lands as part of this process.

=== Other civic organizations ===
He was a member of a number of civic organizations throughout his career and retirement. In 1910, he worked on the census with Roland B. Dixon. For three years beginning in 1912 he served the State Conference of Charities and Correction as chairman of Universities and Social Welfare section. In 1931, he was the director for Huntingdon's Community Center Work. He served on the Pennsylvania Association for Adult Education's Executive Committee in 1935. The same year, he also helped establish a public library in Huntingdon.

== Personal life ==
McKenzie married Nettie Evalyn Tressel in April 1915. She was the daughter of Mary (Hawkins) Tressel and Rev. Emmanuel Greenwold Tressel, a Lutheran minister. He traveled to France in 1925 and stayed there for a year. The McKenzies had two daughters. He died in Huntingdon, Pennsylvania, on September 1, 1957. He was buried at the Riverview Cemetery in Huntingdon.

His papers are held at the Tennessee State Library and Archives and the Fisk University Library Special Collections, both of which are located in Nashville, Tennessee.
