= Red Fox James =

Prominent Native American

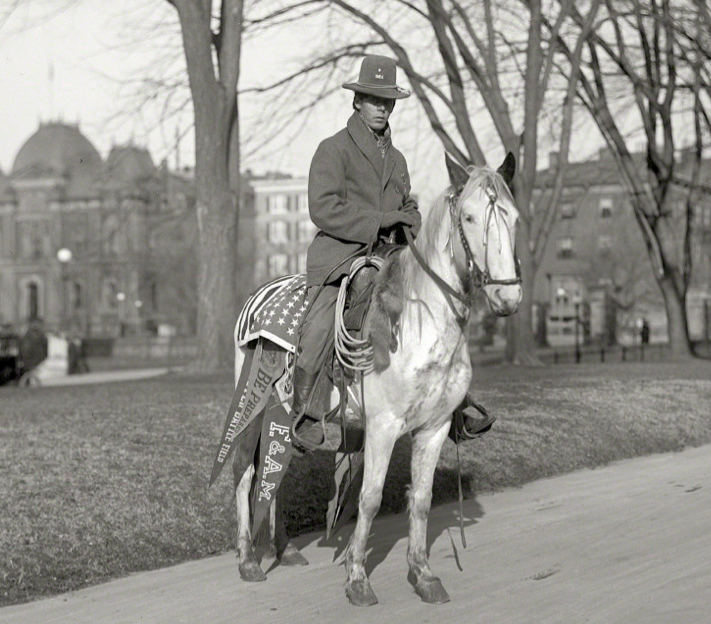
Red Fox James at the White House, 1915

Rev. Red Fox James PH D. D. D., also known as Red Fox Skiuhushu, was a Native American, presumed to be from the Blackfoot Tribe of Montana. He is best known for riding over 4,000 miles on horseback from state to state seeking approval for a day to honor Native Americans. On December 14, 1915, he presented the endorsements of 24 state governments at the White House.

Red Fox was an active member of the Society of American Indians and was the Most High Chief of the Tipi Order of America. He was also the first to organize the Indian Boy Scouts in America, at the United States Indian School in Carlisle, Pennsylvania.

By 1920, Red Fox was the Head Chief of the American Indian Tepee Christian Mission, a cooperative of the American Christian Missionary Society.

== The First American Indian Boy Scout Troop ==
In January 1915 he organized The First American Indian Boy Scout Troop; Boy Scout Troop 1 Carlisle, Pennsylvania.

== Support for women's suffrage ==
Red Fox James was a supporter of giving women the right to vote, because "In the early days, before the white-man came, the Indian women had equal voice in the council, and even was [sic] elected chieftain..."

== New York City College speech ==
On July 4, 1917 Red Fox James gave a speech at New York City College Stadium 25,000 people were present including US Secretary of War Newton D. Baker.

== Adoption of Florence Harding ==
In 1920 Red Fox James, as Chief of The Tipi Order of America, presented Florence Harding with honorary Indian Citizenship and the Indian name "Snow Bird" meaning Worker.

== Known biographical timeline ==
- Born about 1884 in Blood Indian Reserve No. 148, Alberta Canada
- Father Thomas St. James
- Mother Blackfoot Indian Woman
- His cousin and later assistant Pastor Rev Black Hawk was born in 1896.
- 1914 Resident of Waldheim, Montana. The town changed its name to Bundy when the railroad arrived in 1919 and was disestablished in 1935.
- First involved with Boy Scouts in 1914.
- In January 1915. Organized The First American Indian Boy Scout Troop; Boy Scout Troop 1 Carlisle, Pennsylvania
- Ordained a minister in 1915.
- Founded TeePee Order in 1915
- 1918 Founded The American Indian Christian Teepee Mission on the Yakima Indian Reservation in Washington State.
- Son Dr. Vincent Red Fox James, Jr
- Death date unknown ( after 1946 )

== See also ==
- Native American Day
- Native American Indian Heritage Month
