= Charles Edwin Dagenett =

Founder of the Society of American Indians

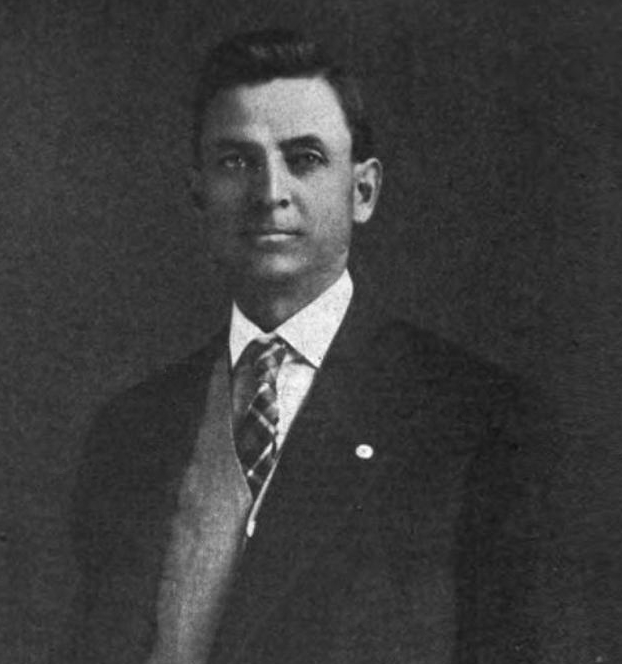
- Born: September 17, 1873; Miami County, Kansas
- Died: March 16, 1941 (aged 67); Tulsa, Oklahoma
- Known for: Founder of the Society of American Indians
- Spouses: Esther Miller (m. 1889) Cornelia Louise Skidmore (m. 1916)

Charles Edwin Dagenett (September 17, 1873 - March 16, 1941) was a founder and leader of the Society of American Indians, the first national American Indian rights organization run by and for American Indians. He also served as the highest ranking Indigenous American in the Bureau of Indian Affairs from 1894 to 1927.

Dagenett was a member of the Peoria Nation.

== Personal life ==
Charles Edwin Dagenett was born in 1873 to Edward R. and Elizabeth (Shaw) Dagenett, and he had seven siblings. He was born on the Wea reservation in Miami County, Kansas, and accompanied his parents to Oklahoma in 1882.

His grandfather, Christmas (Noel) Dagenet, was the agent of the Peoria Reservation in Miami, Oklahoma and served Wear nation and the U.S. government at Treaty of St. Mary's signed in 1818.

Later in life, he married a classmate from the Carlisle Indian School, Esther Miller in 1889. He is also noted to have married Cornelia Louise Skidmore on April 15, 1916. Charles and Cornelia had two sons: Charles Phillip and Robert Henry.

He died at his home in Tulsa, Oklahoma on March 16, 1941, at age 67, and is buried in Rose Hill Memorial Park.

== Education and work ==
Charles E. Dagenett entered the Carlisle Indian School on November 15, 1887, graduated in 1891, and ultimately departed on December 14, 1891. During his time at Carlisle Indian School, Dagenett served as editor of The Red Man, the school newspaper.

After his time at Carlisle Indian School, Dagenett attended Dickinson College and graduated from Eastman Business College in Poughkeepsie, New York.

Following education, Dagenett was the Supervisor of Indian Employment in Denver, Colorado; executive committee chairman of the American Indian Association; and Supervisor of Indian Employment at the Indian Office in Washington, D.C. Dagenett is credited with creating the Office of Indian Employment at the Bureau of Indian Affairs and successfully employed thousands of American Indians in major labor-intensive projects and corporate industries.

== Society of American Indians ==
The Society of American Indians (1911–1923), originally called the American Indian Association, was the first national American Indian rights organization run by and for Indigenous Americans. The group was founded by 50 Indigenous Americans with hopes to address problems that disproportionately impacted Indigenous people, including healthcare, education, civil rights, and local government.

Along with five other Indigenous American intellectuals, Dagenett formed the American Indian Association in 1911 at the Ohio State University. Shortly following the meeting, a Temporary Executive Committee was formed, upon which Dagenett was named as Chairman. Later that year, he was officially had the chair. Come October 1911, Dagenett declined to continue as Executive Committee Chairman and was elected Secretary-Treasurer.

Throughout his time with the Society of American Indians, many people were suspicious of Dagenett's inclusion in the Executive Committee because of his position as Supervisor of Employment at the Bureau of Indian Affairs. Many Indigenous members of the Society regarded the Bureau with contempt and viewed it as representing white oppression and control, and that Indigenous people affiliated with the Bureau worked against the race. McKenzie noted that "a considerable body of Indians are positively afraid of and opposed to the government," and that they feel "a government employee is not morally free to express his own independent judgment."

In 1913, the Society met in Denver, Colorado where Dagenett was elected the second vice president.
