= American Indian Defense Association =

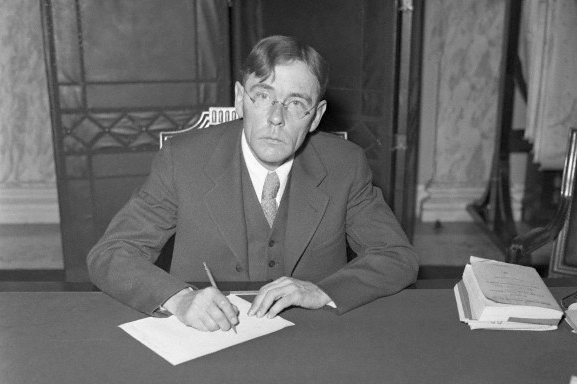
John Collier (May 4, 1884 – May 8, 1968), Commissioner for the Bureau of Indian Affairs, 1933–1945. Collier founded AIDI in 1923.

The American Indian Defense Association (AIDA) was an organization founded in 1923 by social worker John Collier that fought to protect religious freedom and tribal property for Native Americans in the United States.

== History ==
In the 1920s Antonio Luhan, a member of the Taos Pueblo, showed John Collier the poor living conditions in American Indian communities. In response to what he saw, Collier founded the American Indian Defense Association. For the next decade Collier headed Indian reform efforts, and in 1933 President Franklin D. Roosevelt appointed Collier as the new commissioner of Indian Affairs. Almost immediately Collier tried to change the government's direction by revitalizing American Indian life and culture.

AIDA was also set up in response to the 1921 and 1923 Leavitt Bill, also known as the Dance Order. This bill threatened to remove the right of Pueblo Indians to perform some of their traditional dances in New Mexico. The Bursum Bill of 1922 also posed a threat as it would authorize the acquisition of Pueblo lands. However, AIDA was able to block both bills successfully.

== American Indian culture ==
American Indians' culture had been stripped away by measures like the Dawes Act, which had ended tribal government and authorized the sale of tribal land to individuals. Between the years 1887 (the year the Dawes Act came into effect) and 1934 (known as the "Allotment era") the government took over 90 million acres (360,000 km^{2}) of tribal lands that were previously guaranteed to tribes by treaties and federal law. Henry Dawes, who authored the Dawes Act, was quoted as saying that to be civilized, one must "wear civilized clothes...cultivate the ground, live in houses, ride in Studebaker wagons, send children to school, drink whiskey and own property."

Antonio Luhan described how government policies and the Bureau of Indian Affairs commissioners who enforced them overwhelmed American Indian culture,

We have got a real friend in John Collier. He really likes Indians. In past time, we had Commissioners against us who tried to stop our ceremony dances and our dances-religious. They nearly destroy us; call our ways bad or moral or something, and put in the paper they are going to stop us. But John Collier fight for us with the Indian Defense Association and he save us. Now, he look far ahead and it is like he is putting a wall all around us to protect us—and this Wheeler-Howard Bill is this wall. And no white man or grafter can come inside and take away our land or our religion which are connected together.

== Indian Reorganization Act ==
To put these reform ideas into law, the United States Congress passed the Indian Reorganization Act of 1934, which reversed the Dawes Act policy, and as described in section 3 of that act it was to "restore to tribal ownership the remaining surplus lands of any Indian reservation heretofore opened, or authorized to be opened, to sale, or any other form of disposal by Presidential proclamation, or by any of the public land laws of the United States". The Act provided funds to start tribal business ventures and to pay for the college education of young American Indians. The allotment process was halted and further losses of Indian land were halted. Tribes were encouraged to create strong tribal governments. Tribes were given the right to form constitutions, have self-government, and to form tribal corporations. A program to provide federal loan money for college and/or vocational school expenses was begun.

== Criticism ==
Critics of the American Indian Defense Association complained that Collier had not obtained enough input from the tribes themselves in formulating policies, and that the programs decreased the power of women in some tribes. Still, two-thirds of the nation's American Indians tribes voted to participate in the new programs.
