= Church of the Holy Apostles (Oneida, Wisconsin) =

Church in Wisconsin, United States

Coordinates: 44°29′45.2″N 88°10′54.0″W

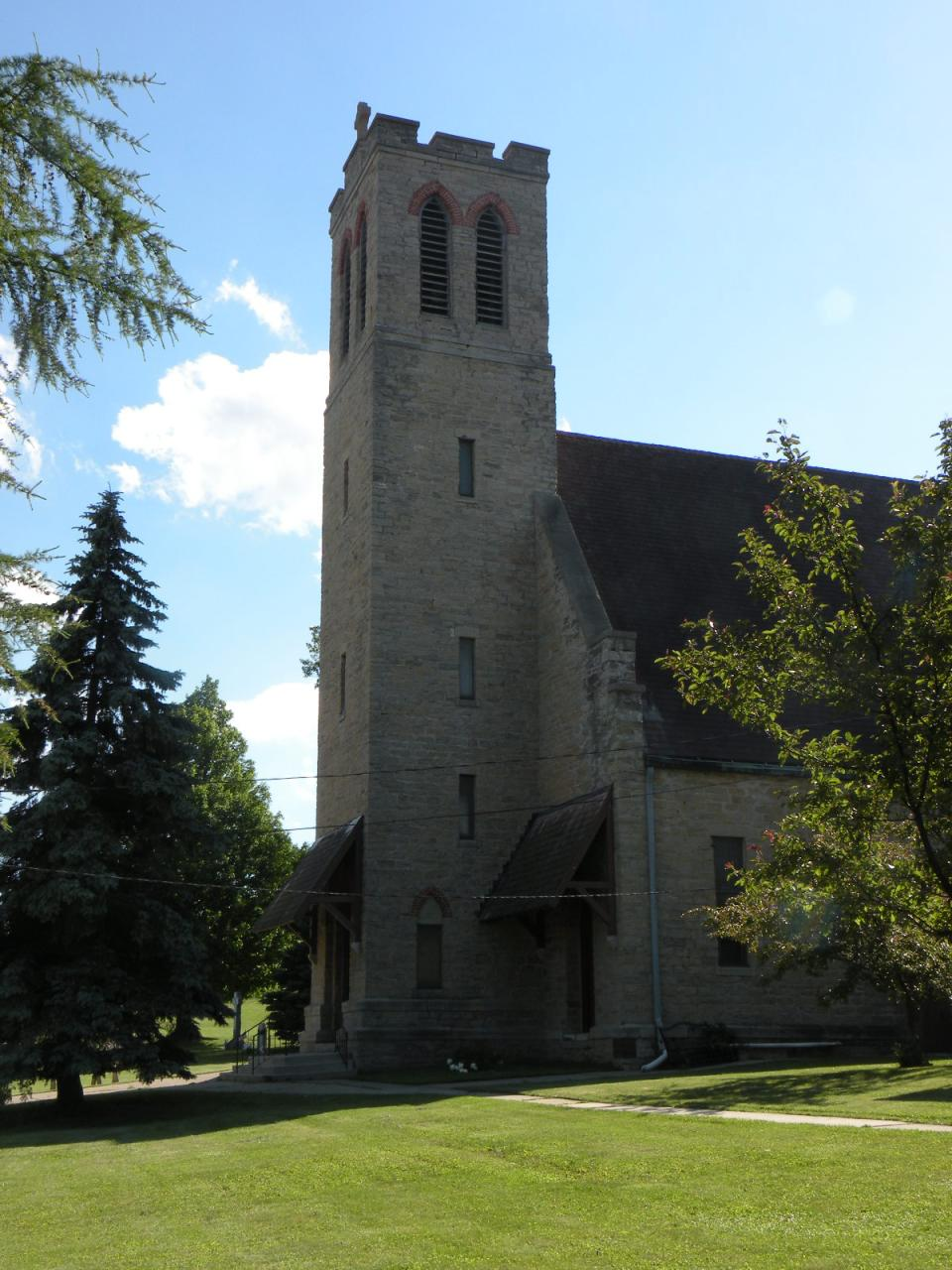
The Church of the Holy Apostles building, Oneida, Wisconsin, erected by the gift of labor by the Oneida people of one day a week over almost a decade. The stone was quarried on the Oneida reservation.

The Church of the Holy Apostles, Oneida, Wisconsin (formerly known as John Henry Hobart Church), United States, is a mission congregation of the Episcopal Diocese of Fond du Lac located on the Oneida Reservation of the Oneida Nation of Wisconsin.

== History ==
The Church of the Holy Apostles is the oldest Indian mission of the Episcopal Church, tracing its roots to the earliest Anglican missionaries from the Church of England and the Society for the Propagation of the Gospel Society for the Propagation of the Gospel in the area that later became central New York, around Oneida Lake. As early as November, 1702, the Rev. John Talbot reported "even the Indians themselves have promised obedience to the faith" with five Five Nations Indians Sachems or Kings having said they "were glad to hear that the Sun shined in England again, since King William's death" and admired that there was now a "woman king [Queen Anne]." They hoped she would "send them some to teach them Religion and establish traffic amongst them, that they might be able to purchase a coat and not to go to Church in bear skins." Over the next century, the Oneida people accepting Christianity, coming to practice the Christian faith by expression as Anglicans and Methodists.

About 1815, Bishop John Henry Hobart of New York licensed Mr. Eleazer Williams, at the earnest request of the Oneida chiefs, as Lay Reader, Catechist, and Schoolmaster to the Oneida. Williams, who would become the first Episcopal missionary in Wisconsin, played a major role in the removal of the Oneida from New York to Wisconsin. He claimed later in life to be the lost Dauphin of France. After removing from New York in the 1820s, the Oneida Indians settled and built a log church building in 1825 in the vicinity of Duck Creek, about 10 miles (16 km) southwest of Green Bay. Williams also translated parts of the Prayer Book and certain hymns into the Mohawk tongue.

On December 2, 1822, Williams wrote a letter to the Domestic and Foreign Missionary Society (the missionary arm of the Episcopal Church) requesting establishment of a mission. On May 22, 1823, the Rev. Norman Nash was appointed as an official missionary for the area around Green Bay, but did not arrive until 1825. Williams had been ordained deacon in 1824 and undoubtedly held services at Oneida among the Indians.

After out-growing the log church, a larger, wood frame "Gothic" church building was built by the Oneidas. The laying of the cornerstone on August 7, 1838 was by Bishop Jackson Kemper, the first Missionary Bishop of the Episcopal Church and his first official act in the territory. The consecration by Bishop Kemper on September 2, 1839 made it the first consecrated non-Roman Catholic church building in what would become Wisconsin. In the fall of 1839, It was in this structure that Dr. William Adams and the Rev. James Lloyd Breck, founders of Nashotah Seminary were ordained. It had a barrel-organ, which was later donated to the public museum in Green Bay.

The now third and present stone church building was due to tireless efforts of the Rev. E. A. Goodnough. In 1870, the Oneidas gave one day a week to quarry the stone. An excellent building plan was prepared by the Rev. Charles Babcock, who was also an architect, as a gift to the mission. The building was to be in the early English style, with low massive walls, heavy buttresses, and a steep roof. It was to be 48 feet (15 m) by 68 feet (21 m), exclusive of porch and chancel. In 1886 the cornerstone was laid, and the building was consecrated in 1887 and named Holy Apostles. In 1895 the chancel was erected. On July 17, 1920 the stone church was struck by lightning and destroyed by the fire, but then rebuilt on the old foundations and re-consecrated by the Rt. Rev. R. H. Weller, Bishop of Fond du Lac on June 11, 1922. The church bell, dedicated to the "Glory of God in pious memory of John Henry Hobart, Bishop of New York" was re-cast after the fire.

The Episcopal Mission was part of Oneida Reservation land held in trust by the United States and continued as such under the various land permutations until title was transferred by the United States to the Trustees of the Diocese of Fond du Lac by an Act of Congress through a patent deed in 1909.

== Oneida Mission Highlights ==
- 1820s, a parochial day school was founded by Eleazer Williams and continued operations until the late 1960s. It was originally a one-room school, but by the 20th century had expanded to two rooms and in the 1940s added a third. It served grades one through eight. At a time when there were no district schools nearby, it served an important function for the community, and even served hot lunch. There was also a library maintained.
- 1825, Bishop John Henry Hobart, Bishop of New York, has an official visitation with the Oneida.
- 1837 Solomon Davis published extracts from the Prayer Book in Oneida
- 1893, a hospital was built just north of the church building after the Rev. Solomon Burleson, persuaded the federal government to establish it. The Hospital closed in the 1940s due to financial pressures.
- 1894, the Sisters of the Holy Nativity began a long service to the mission, building a house next to the stone church that no longer exists. In addition to their parochial work in religious instruction and as licensed lay leaders, they also worked in the Oneida Hospital. They also helped to establish the lace industry on the Reservation.
- 1895, Oneida Chief Cornelius Hill, last of the old Oneida chiefs, is ordained to the Sacred Order of Deacons on June 27 by the Second Bishop of Fond du Lac, the Rt. Rev. Charles Chapman Grafton.
- 1901, Mission Creamey opens with one customer bringing milk.
- 1903, Oneida Chief Cornelius Hill is ordained to the Sacred Order of Priests.
- 1905, Oneida Hospital converted into a dispensary.
- 1906, the Grafton Parish House was built. This functioned as a community center and included a basketball court and movie projection equipment. In the late 1990s the building had fallen into disrepair and was deeded by the Diocese of Fond du Lac to the Oneida Tribe of Wisconsin who made a complete renovation so it could continue to be used by the Oneida community.
- 1908, Indian Claim 141 is purchased from the Powles family to allow for expansion of the cemetery.
- 1930, Vicarage, a church-owned home for the priest, was erected.
- 1939, Boy Scout and Girl Scout Troops are formed at Holy Apostles.
- 1946, the Sisters of St. Anne arrived and took over the work of the Sisters of the Holy Nativity.
- 1947, the remains of Eleazer Williams were removed from St. James Cemetery at Hogansburg, New York and re-interred on the grounds of the church.
- 1940s, 10 acres (40,000 m^{2}) of land located directly behind the church were deeded to the Oneida Tribe for recreational purposes.
- 1960s, 25 acres (100,000 m^{2}) of land located between the athletic fields and Duck Creek were deeded to the Oneida Tribe for them to build housing units.
- 1967, Oneida Mission school closed.
- 1977, Parish Hall closed. Community events held in church basement. In the 1990s ownership was transferred to the Oneida Tribe of Wisconsin who renovated the structure for community use.
- In the late 1990s, a small altar and a podium were purchased from St. Mark's Episcopal Church, Oconto which was closed and later demolished. The two items were of dark wood matched the rest of the Altar furniture. Both were artistically carved with the podium having an eagle carved right at the top of the stand.

== Prominent Lay People ==
- Chief Schenando, last of the New York chiefs who headed up the Oneidas when they came west. A descendant of the famous Chief Schenando who was a friend of George Washington, he was a noted orator. He died in 1897 and is buried in the Holy Apostles cemetery.
- Chief Daniel Bread was a famous Council Chief and prominent in the affairs of the Oneida, both in New York and Wisconsin. He died in 1873 and is buried in the Holy Apostles cemetery.
- Nancy Cornelius, the first trained Indian nurse in the United States.

== Clergy Serving ==
This is listing of clergy who have served as missionaries, vicars or deacons.

- 1821-32 Eleazer Williams.
- 1825-27 Richard Nash.
- 1827-36 Richard Fish Cadle. Also Rector of Christ Church, Green Bay.
- 1836-47 Solomon Davis.
- 1847-52 Franklin R. Haff.
- 1853-90 Edward A. Goodnough. Early graduate of Nashotah House Seminary, sent to serve Oneida by Bishop Kemper as friend and pastor. Buried in the Holy Apostles Cemetery.
- 1891-96 Solomon S. Burleson. Lawyer, dentist, and doctor of medicine, built the Oneida Hospital. Buried in the Holy Apostles Cemetery.
  - 1896 John K. Burleson, Assistant.
  - 1896-1903 Cornelius Hill, Deacon. Ordained at Holy Apostles.
- 1897-1906 Frank W. Merrill.
  - 1901 John C. Jetter, Assistant.
  - 1903-06 Cornelius Hill, Assistant. Ordained at Holy Apostles.
  - 1905 R.E. Grubb, Assistant.
- 1906-08 A. Parker Curtiss.
- 1908-20 William B. Thorn.
- 1920-27 William Watson.
  - 1924 Harry Kerstetter, Assistant.
  - 1925 F.W. Sherman, Assistant.
- 1928-37 Lawrence Herbert Grant, brother of California State Senator Edwin Grant.
- 1938-56 William F. Christian.
  - 1951-53 Richard Becker, Assistant.
- 1956-57 Phillip I. Livingston.
- 1957-60 G. Colyn Brittain.
- 1960-63 Harold L. Goetz.
  - 1960 C.B. Russell, Assistant.
- 1963-67 Harry C. Vedder. Ordained at Holy Apostles.
  - 1963 Nelson Skinner, Assistant.
- 1967 Phillip I. Livingston
  - 1967 Robert A. Good, Assistant.
- 1968-76 Larry A. Westlund
  - 1970 Jon E. Hanshew, Assistant.
  - 1974 John E Walker, III, Assistant.
  - 1975 Michael W. Minter, Assistant.
  - 1976 Paul A. Cheek, Assistant. Ordained at Holy Apostles.
- 1977-78 Charles P. Wallis
- 1978 Thomas Sewall.
- 1978-82 Paul A. Cheek.
  - 1979 Russell S. Northway, Assistant.
- 1980-93 James H. Dolan.
  - 1983 William J.M. Smith, Assistant. Ordained at Holy Apostles.
  - 1990-2009 Edmund Powless, Deacon. Buried in the Holy Apostles Cemetery.
- 1994-98 John F. Splinter.
- 1998-2001 Brad McIntyre.
- 2002-07 Dewey Silas. Buried in the Holy Apostles Cemetery.
  - 2005–present Deborah Heckel, Deacon.
- 2008–11 Kristina Henning
- 2011–12 Robert Clarke, Priest-in-Charge
- 2017-2023 Rodger Patience
- The Rev. James C. Biegler, present
