= Eleazer Williams =

Canadian-American clergyman

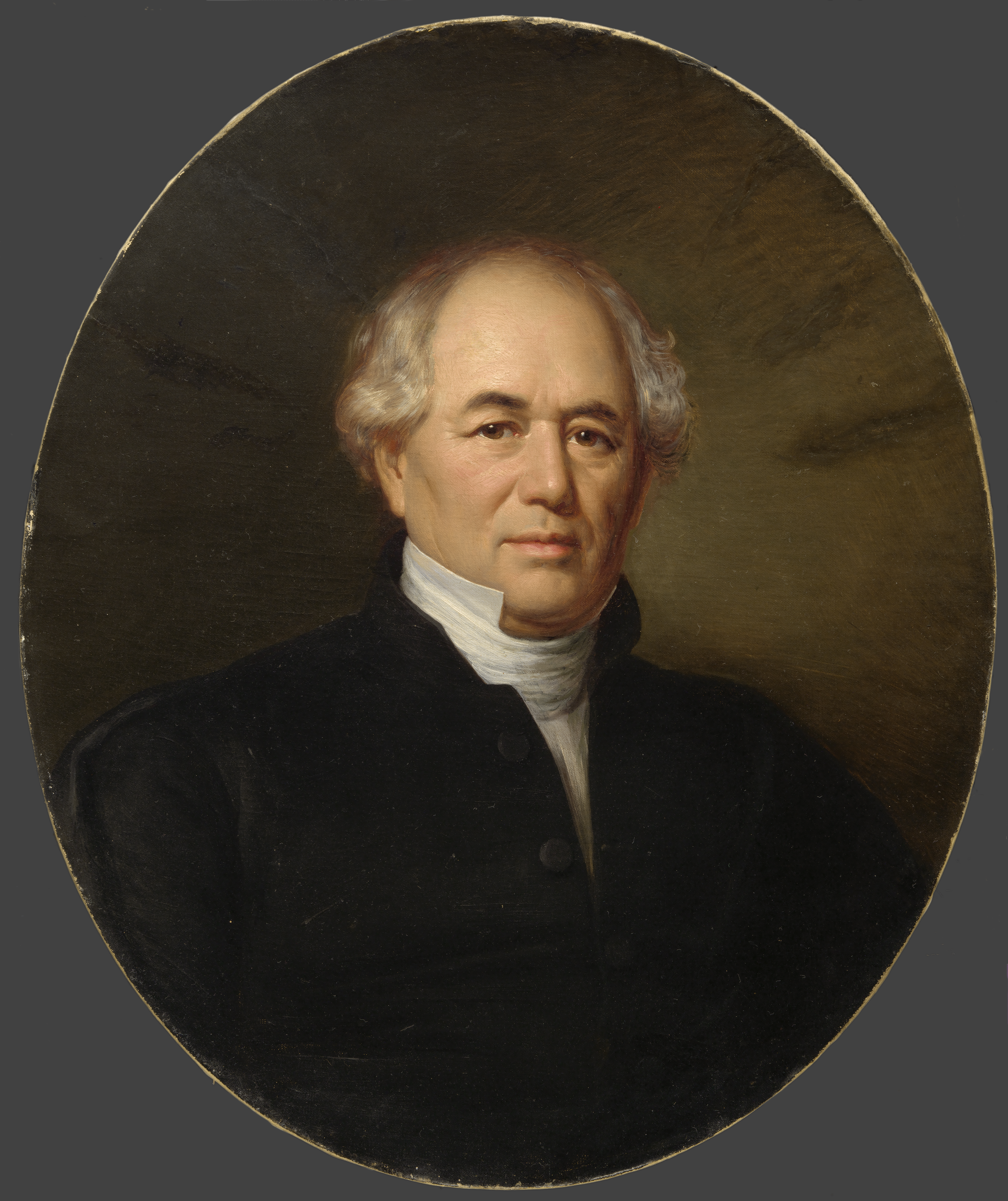
Eleazer Williams, attributed to Giuseppe Fagnani, 1853

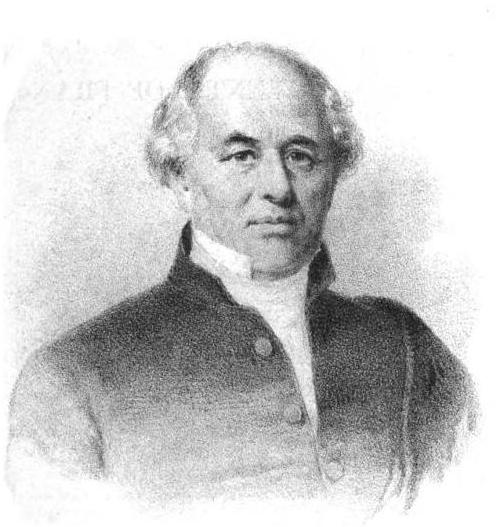
1854 portrait

Eleazer Williams (May 1788 – August 28, 1858) was a Canadian-American clergyman and missionary of Mohawk descent.

He published tracts and a spelling book in the Iroquois language, translated the Book of Common Prayer into Iroquois, and wrote a biography of Chief Te-ho-ra-gwa-ne-gen (his father Thomas Williams). In later years he claimed that he was the ‘Lost Dauphin’ of France (Louis XVII).

== Life ==
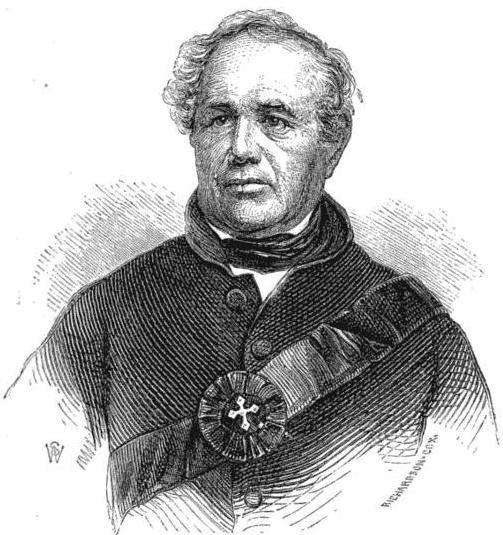
1853 portrait

Williams was born in Sault Saint-Louis, Quebec, to Thomas Williams. He received his education at Dartmouth College, New Hampshire. In 1815, he joined the Episcopal Church. In 1817, Bishop John Henry Hobart appointed Williams to be a missionary to the Oneida people of upstate New York.

In 1820 and 1821, Williams led delegations of Native Americans to Green Bay, Wisconsin, where they secured a cession of land from the Menominee and Winnebago tribes in the Fox River Valley at Little Chute and along Duck Creek. Historians have disputed the significance of Williams' leadership to this migration compared to that of the Oneida people themselves, including Oneida leader Daniel Bread. The following year Williams made his home there and married a fourteen-year-old Menominee girl named Marie Madeleine Jourdain, one of his pupils; contemporary accounts noted she was "not a willing party to the contract." In 1826 he was ordained a deacon.

In 1839 and afterwards, Williams began to make the claim that he was the French "Lost Dauphin". During the 1850s he openly became a pretender to the throne of France, but he died in poverty at Hogansburg, New York. In 1887, author Augusta de Grasse Stevens defended his claim in her book The Lost Dauphin.

Williams was buried at Saint James' Cemetery in Hogansburg on August 28, 1858. In 1947, his remains and tombstone were moved to Holy Apostles Cemetery in Oneida, Wisconsin. His tombstone at Oneida indicates that he was a Freemason.

== Legacy ==
Williams' plot of 19 acres (7.7 ha) of land at his Wisconsin home was designated Lost Dauphin State Park by the state. It was later taken off the list of state parks and his house was burned. It remains designated as Lost Dauphin Park with the land remaining state-owned. The flagstone foundation of the house remains visible.

== Publications ==
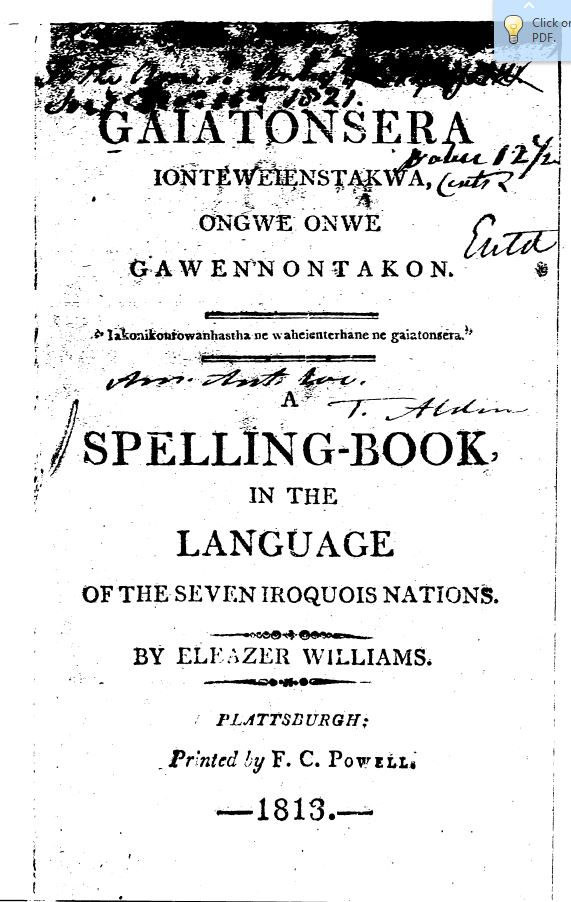
Title page for Gaiatonsera ionteweienstakwa

- The Book of Common Prayer, according to the use of the Protestant Episcopal Church in the United States of America : Translated into the Mohawk or Iroquois language, by the request of the Domestic Committee of the Board of Missions of the Protestant Episcopal Church. New York: H.B. Durand. 1867. OCLC 697994178.
- Gaiatonsera ionteweienstakwa, ongwe onwe gawennontakon. A spelling-book in the language of the seven Iroquois nations. Plattsburgh, New York: F.C. Powell. 1813. OCLC 24897454.
- Good news to the Iroquois Nation: a tract, on man's primitive rectitude, his fall, and his recovery through Jesus Christ. Burlington, Vermont: Samuel Mills. 1813. OCLC 15441682.

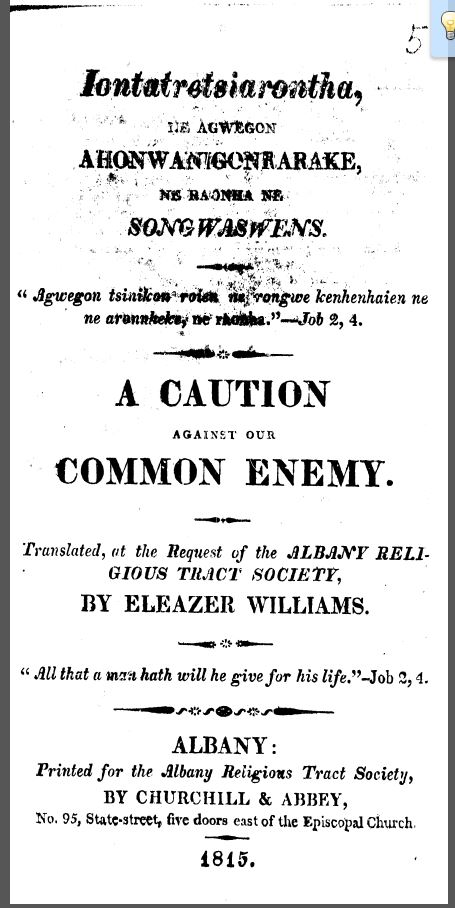
Title page from Iontatretsiarontha, ne agwegon ahonwan igonrarake, ne raonha ne songwaswens = A caution against our common enemy

- Iontatretsiarontha, ne agwegon ahonwan igonrarake, ne raonha ne songwaswens : A caution against our common enemy. Albany, New York: Albany Religious Tract Society by Churchill & Abbey. 1815. OCLC 15462861.
- Life of Te-ho-ra-gwa-ne-gen : alias Thomas Williams, a chief of the Caughnawaga tribe of Indians in Canada. Albany, New York: J. Munsell. 1859. OCLC 3444222.
- The salvation of sinners through the riches of divine grace: two homilies pronounced at Oneida Castle in the audience of the Oneida Indians at their eighth triennial anniversary since the conversion of six hundred pagans of that tribe to the Christian faith, on the 8th of August 1841. Green Bay, Wisconsin Territory: Republican Office. 1842. OCLC 277220738.
- Selections from the Psalms and Hymns according to the Use of the Protestant Episcopal Church in the United States of America. New York: Protestant Episcopal Tract Society. 1853. OCLC 6135762.
