= Cornelius Hill =

Oneida leader (1834–1907)

- Onangwatgo
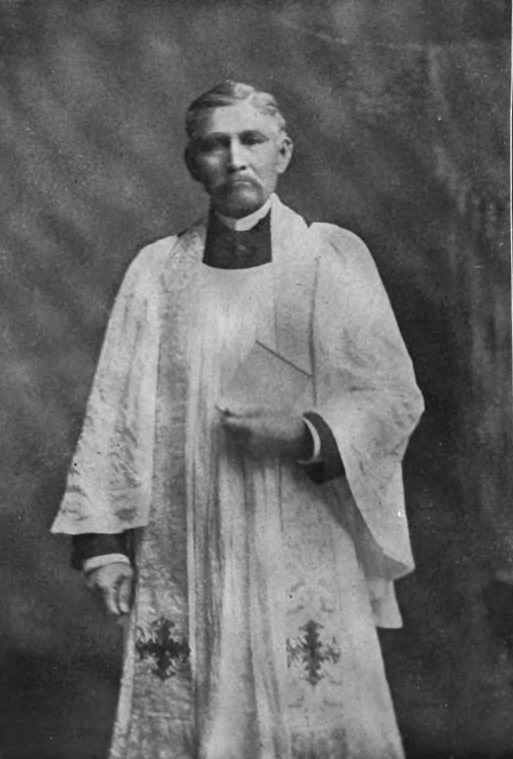
- The Rev. Cornelius Hill
- Born: November 13, 1834
- Died: January 25, 1907 (aged 72); Oneida, Wisconsin

Cornelius Hill (November 13, 1834 – January 25, 1907) or Onangwatgo (“Big Medicine”) was the last hereditary chief of the Oneida Nation, and fought to preserve his people's lands and rights under various treaties with the United States government. A lifelong Episcopalian, he was ordained a priest of the Episcopal Church in the United States of America at age 69, and ministered to his people until shortly before his death.

The Oneida, one of the five founding nations of the Haudenosaunee Confederacy, had aligned with the Americans during the American Revolutionary War, but when faced with pressure from European settlers who often mistook them for members of hostile tribes, had begun negotiating with the Ho-Chunk and Menominee people and moving to Wisconsin around 1821. Many members had become Christians under missionaries sent by the Episcopal and Methodist Churches to both New York and Wisconsin. In 1825, tribal members built a log church near the Fox River and an important portage on their new lands about 10 miles southwest of Green Bay, Wisconsin, which they called the Hobart Chapel after its consecrating bishop, John Henry Hobart of New York.

== Early life ==
Cornelius Hill was born on tribal lands in Wisconsin and baptised in due course by missionary bishop Jackson Kemper. In 1843, Episcopal missionary the Rev. James Lloyd Breck escorted the ten-year-old and two other boys to the newly established Nashotah House to learn English and be educated for five years.

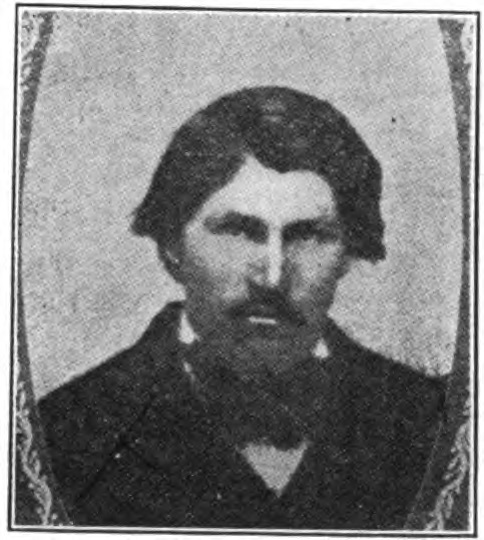
Chief Hill

== Career ==
As a teenager, at a council of Oneida from New York, Canada and Wisconsin, Hill became a chief of his Bear Clan. At age 18 he was given responsibility for distributing the annuity money (from service in the Revolutionary War) among his people. He was later responsible for taking the census of tribal members (the number of which doubled in Wisconsin in the five decades of his leadership). Several times Hill went to Albany, New York and Washington, D.C. to advocate for his people.

European settlers were also moving into Wisconsin, and coveted tribal lands, which were held in common under an 1838 treaty negotiated by Chief Daniel Bread, who by his death in 1873 thought such private allocation inevitable. The next year, Hill drafted a petition to New York's legislature in Albany concerning interference with Oneida fishing rights under previous treaties, which was causing considerable hardship to tribal members remaining in New York. At least one Indian Agent supposedly assigned to help the tribe also forbade them to sell shingles and other lumber products to support themselves during a crop failure, which Hill and missionary and teacher the Rev. Edward A. Goodnough (who worked among the Oneidas from 1863 to 1890) thought was designed to get the tribe to sell lands to settlers (if not his cronies), and eventually managed to secure that agent's dismissal. Hill also helped tribal members learn new farming techniques and secure machinery. Women also made baskets and beadwork for sale, and after 1900 learned to make lace to support themselves in the modernized world.

Nonetheless, pursuant to the Dawes Act of 1887, the federal government allocated the tribe's Wisconsin land to individuals beginning in 1892, who were to be allowed to transfer that property after a 25-year waiting period. As had happened in New York State, unscrupulous persons often tried to swindle tribal members out of their allocations. Throughout his life, Hill fought such dismemberment of tribal property, as well as government attempts to move his people further west. In 1893 after negotiations with the federal government, Hill, together with the Rev. Solomon S. Burleson (also a lawyer and doctor), secured a hospital and boarding school for the reservation, and the following year the Sisters of the Holy Nativity sent nuns to work as nurses and teachers there.

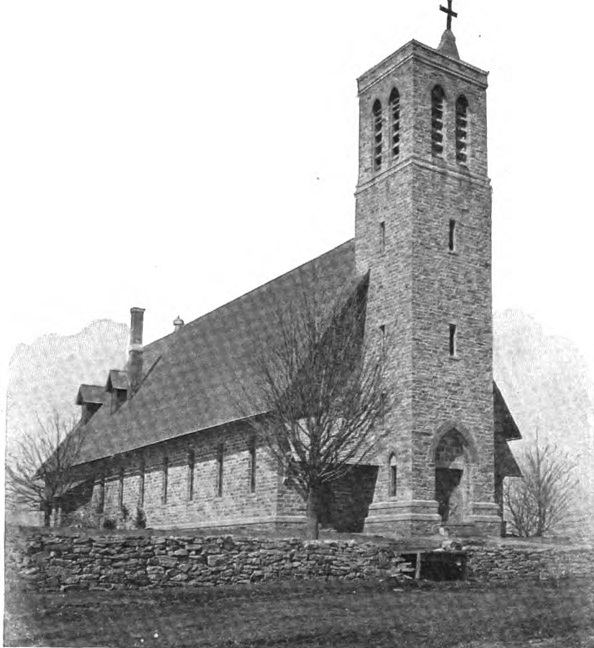
Hobart Church

Having for years served as an organist and interpreter for Episcopal services by the Rev. Goodnough and his successors, as well as his tribe's sachem and delegate to church councils, Hill thought ordination would bring additional authority among the settler community as well as help him become a bridge between the cultures. Since 1870 (perhaps in Thanksgiving for having been relatively spared from horrendous forest fires that devastated Wisconsin), church members had volunteered at a limestone quarry one day a week, in order to dress stone for a new church building. In 1886 they laid the cornerstone for a new gothic stone chapel, which they named the Church of the Holy Apostles, to replace an overly small and somewhat decrepit wood chapel. On June 27, 1895, Bishop Charles C. Grafton ordained Hill a deacon. However, the event was bittersweet as Hill's infant son had died in an epidemic and was scheduled for burial that very afternoon. Furthermore, his ally the Rev. Burleson died in February 1897, months before the new church's formal consecration, and Burleson's popular youngest son (all five of whom had become priests) was transferred to Texas the following year. On June 24, 1903, Bishop Grafton ordained Hill as a priest, the first of his people; during the ceremony Hill repeated his vows in his native language. The Wisconsin reservation also had a Methodist mission with a dedicated missionary and a Catholic chapel served by a priest from De Pere, about ten miles away.

== Family ==
At the time of his ordination, aged 69, Hill's wife, who had borne 8 children, had not learned English. Several of their children went to the Hampton Indian School after their education at the reservation's school.

== Death and legacy ==
Hill died on January 25, 1907, having fallen ill shortly before Christmas. After three requiems and funeral at the Church of the Holy Apostles attended by 800 persons, he was buried in the graveyard with other tribal members and the missionaries he assisted. When fire from a lightning strike on July 17, 1920 destroyed the Gothic stone church, it was rebuilt in a similar design. The Oneida continued to revere Hill's wisdom and sanctity, relating tales of their leader to Works Progress Administration historians during the Great Depression, even though by 1920 only a few hundred acres of the reservation were owned by tribal members (the remaining approximately 65,000 acres being owned by settlers before the Indian Reorganization Act of 1934 caused the Bureau of Indian Affairs to begin reversing the policy).
