= Joseph McDowell =

Joseph McDowell may refer to:

- Joseph "Pleasant Gardens" McDowell (1758–1799), American Revolutionary War soldier and legislator from North Carolina
- Joseph McDowell Jr. (1756–1801), "Quaker Meadows Joe", American Revolutionary War soldier and legislator from North Carolina
- Joseph J. McDowell (1800–1877), U.S. Representative from Ohio, son of Joseph "Quaker Meadows" McDowell
- Joseph Nash McDowell (1804–1868), American doctor
