= Lillie Rosa Minoka Hill =

American physician

Lillie Rosa Minoka-Hill
- Lillie Rosa Minoka Hill, unknown year
- Born: August 30, 1875; New Jersey
- Died: March 18, 1952 (aged 76); Fond du Lac, Wisconsin
- Education: Women's Medical College of Pennsylvania (now part of Drexel University) (1899)
- Occupation: Physician
- Spouse(s): Charles Hill, m. 1905, d. 1916
- Parents: Joshua Gibbons Allen, physician and obstetrician (father); Mohawk woman (mother)

Lillie Rosa Minoka-Hill (August 30, 1875 – March 18, 1952) was an American physician. Although referred to as a Native American woman, (Note: The definition of who is a "Native American" can vary. In some cases, tribes or villages based it upon whether the person has citizenship or membership in the tribe, and that criteria can vary by tribe. There is no universal definition of what makes and Indian or Native American. The Office of Tribal Justice of the U.S. Department of Justice states: "As a general principle, an Indian is a person who is of some degree Indian blood and is recognized as an Indian by a Tribe and/or the United States. No single federal or tribal criterion establishes a person's identity as an Indian. Government agencies use differing criteria to determine eligibility for programs and services. Tribes also have varying eligibility criteria for membership. It is important to distinguish between the ethnological term 'Indian' and the political/legal term 'Indian.' The protections and services provided by the United States for tribal members flow not from an individual's status as an American Indian in an ethnological sense, but because the person is a member of a Tribe recognized by the United States and with which the United States has a special trust relationship." The St. Regis Mohawk Indian Reservation, where Minoka's mother was from, primarily consists of Mohawks, but there are some Abenaki and Oswegatchie people from the Oswegatchie Mission who have been affiliated with the reservation since the French and Indian War, but the culture is predominantly Mohawk. The reservation supports members of the reservation. Their website states that: "In order to become a tribal member, your eligibility for enrollment will be determined upon completion of the application in accordance with the 25% Akwesasne Mohawk blood quantum requirement.") Minoka was not a citizen of any Native American tribe. She was told her mother was a Mohawk. Her father was of Quaker descent. Regardless of the uncertainty of her family life, she made the most of education provided by her father. Minoka was educated at a Quaker boarding school in Philadelphia. She attended medical school there, and rare for women at the time, obtained her degree in 1899.

For decades, Minoka-Hill operated a clinic at her house, on the Oneida Nation of Wisconsin reservation. Her husband died in 1916, leaving her the family provider, care giver for her children, and farm operator.

Minoka-Hill gained her state medical license in Wisconsin in 1934 and, in her later years, was honored for her contributions to rural medical care. In 1947, she was adopted as an honorary member by the Oneida Nation of Wisconsin, the only person so honored in the 20th century. They gave her the name Yo-da-gent, meaning "she who carries aid" or "she who serves".

== Early life and education ==
Lillie Minnetoga, that she later changed to Minoka, was born August 30, 1875, in New Jersey. (Note: There are other places where Minoka was said to be born, but her census record of 1900 shows she was born in New Jersey.) Minoka's mother, who was under the care of Dr. Joshua Allen, died during childbirth. The name of her mother, said to be a Mohawk woman, is unknown. Dr. Allen, a bachelor, (Note: He had no other heirs than Minoka.) was her father, but she did not know that as a child. Joshua Gibbons Allen (1832-1903) was a Quaker physician, obstetrician, and gynecological expert who graduated from the University of Pennsylvania Medical School in 1856. For 23 years, he was the physician-in-chief at the Lying-in-Charity in Philadelphia.

Minoka, who was not a citizen of any Native American tribe, lived with her maternal Mohawk grandmother of an unknown name in Atlantic City, New Jersey and occasionally she was visited by Dr. Allen from Philadelphia.

Minoka was removed from her home at five. Allen gave her the name Rosa and took her to a Quaker girl's boarding school, Grahame Institute. It was operated by Israel and Jane Grahame, who were caring. Allen, who let people believe that he was her benefactor, brought her books of Native Americans and taught her about the Mohawk people, and what he knew about their history and lifestyle. She learned that Quakers valued caring and kindness. Minoka studied French in Quebec (Canada) for one year when she was thirteen. After she returned to Philadelphia, Minoka converted to Catholicism. Her father respected her decision.

In 1895, when Minoka was 18, Allen let her know that he was her father and that she was not misbegotten. He would not tell her about her mother, though.

== Medical school and early career ==
Minoka decided to become a nurse after graduating from high school, but her father said that she should be a physician because of the education she had received and he paid for her education. Minoka attended the Women's Medical College of Pennsylvania (now part of Drexel University). She earned her degree in 1899. Minoka was the second Native American woman in the United States to obtain a medical degree, (Note: There are more sources from within this article that state that she is the "second Native American woman in the United States to" obtain a medical degree or be a physician.) after Susan La Flesche Picotte (Omaha).

After she and her friend Frances Tyson graduated, they also setup a private practice for walk-in patients. Minoka provided medical care for Native American students at the Lincoln Institute boarding school. Minoka made friends with the students there, like Anna Hill, an Oneida student at Lincoln Institute from Wisconsin. Anna introduced Minoka to her brother Charles Abram Hill. She secured her internship at the public Woman's Hospital in 1900. At the Women's Clinic, she treated poor women.

Her father died in September 1903, but not before declaring that Minoka was his daughter in a newspaper notice. She was left his estate valued at about $50,000 (equivalent to $1,791,667 in 2025) in the form of a trust fund. Feeling insecure, she shared the information about her father, her mother, and her birth with Charles Hill, which made them closer.

== Marriage and family ==
In June 1905, Minoka married Charles Hill in Philadelphia, becoming Lillie Rosa Minoka-Hill. They lived in Oneida, Wisconsin on his farm alotment on the reservation. Charles established a farm and built a two-story house. He wanted a farmer's wife, though she wanted to stay active in her medical practice.

Minoka-Hill learned traditional Oneida medical practices from Charles' grandmother, like the curative powers of plants, wildflowers, and roots. She integrated that information with the medical training that she received and her clinical experiences. Without a Wisconsin medical license, Minoka-Hill worked without pay for family and friends, which prevented legal issues.

Minoka-Hill and Charles had six children, Rosa Melissa, Charles Allen, Norbert, Alfred Grahame, and twins, Jane Frances and Josephine.

In 1916, Charles died on Easter Sunday of a appendicitis. Minoka-Hill was left to raise six children, five of whom were less than six years old, and take care of the farm and its animals on her own. During the winter of 1917–1918, her children contracted influenza during the international epidemic, but all survived. She took care of her neighbors and friends and relied upon their payments in food for her family.

== Medical practice ==
The reservation's physician, Dr. Josiah Powless served during World War I and Minoka-Hill was the lone remaining physician in 1916 or 1917. Powless died just before the end of the war. After that, Minoka-Hill's services were even more critical; she tended to nearly all the tribe's local medical needs. She often spent entire nights at bedsides.

In 1929, her trust fund, established by her father Joshua Allen, collapsed in the Stock Market Crash that began the Great Depression.

In 1934, Minoka-Hill gained her Wisconsin medical license. Being licensed allowed her to admit patients to the hospital, charge fees, and prescribe medicine. Minoka-Hill received her Wisconsin license and attained a job as a local health officer. With an office in town she saw white and Native American patients.

A heart attack in 1946 forced Minoka-Hill into semi-retirement, though she continued her clinic in her home, until her death in Fond du Lac, Wisconsin on March 18, 1952, of a heart attack.

== Legacy and honors ==
- 1947, she received the Indian Achievement Award from the Indian Fire Council of Chicago, for personal achievement and humanitarian service to her people.
- 1947, she was adopted as an honorary member by the Oneida Nation of Wisconsin. They gave her the name Yo-da-gent, meaning "she who carries aid" or "she who serves".
- 1949, she was the honoree of the American Medical Association at its annual conference, held that year in Atlantic City.
- 1949, the Wisconsin Medical Association voted to award her a lifetime honorary membership.
- 1954, a granite monument was erected near Oneida in her honor. The inscription reads: "Physician, Good Samaritan, and friend of People of all religions in this community, erected to her memory by the Indians and white people." It includes: "I was sick and you visited me."
- By 1988, Norbert Hill administered the Dr. Rosa Minoka Hill Fund, which grants pre-college school scholarships to Native Americans.
- 2014, the Dr. Lillie Rosa Minoka-Hill School opened in September.
- By 2016, the Minoka-Hill monument was erected in Oneida, Wisconsin in her honor. It was erected at the Oneida Health Center.

The historical figure, Charlie Hill, an Oneida comedian was the grandson of Dr. Lillie Rosa Minoka-Hill. A granddaughter, now known as Roberta Hill Whiteman became a poet and professor of English and American Indian Studies at the University of Wisconsin–Madison.
