= Kemper College =

Defunct American college in St. Louis, Missouri

- Type: Private Liberal arts college
- Active: 1837–1845
- Founder: Jackson Kemper
- Religious affiliation: Episcopal Church
- President: Reverend P. R. Minard (1837 - 1839); Reverend Silas Axtell Crane (after 1839)
- Location: St. Louis, Missouri, U.S.

Kemper College was a short-lived liberal arts college in St. Louis, Missouri, associated with the Episcopal Church in America.

Chartered on January 13, 1837, the school opened for class on October 15, 1838. The school opened the first medical school in the Western United States in 1840. Struggling financially, the college closed its doors in 1845, while the medical department merged with the University of Missouri. The medical school later became the Washington University School of Medicine.

== Curriculum ==
Kemper College used a great books curriculum with a focus on Episcopal theology. Subjects included courses on mathematics, geography, grammar, French, Greek, Latin, astronomy, and logic.

Students were required to attend church services every Sunday and tobacco products were banned from campus.

=== Medical college ===
In an effort to expand, President Rev. Silas Crane opened a medical department in 1840, recruiting Dr. Joseph McDowell as the medical department's sole professor. Kemper's medical school became the Missouri Medical College after the school's closure, later transforming into the Washington University School of Medicine.

== Decline ==
Kemper College was a classic example of overzealous college expansion in the 19th century United States. President Crane expanded the school rapidly, accumulating large debts on behalf of the college. The debts proved the downfall of Kemper College, which failed in 1845.
