= Bishopstead =

- U.S. National Register of Historic Places
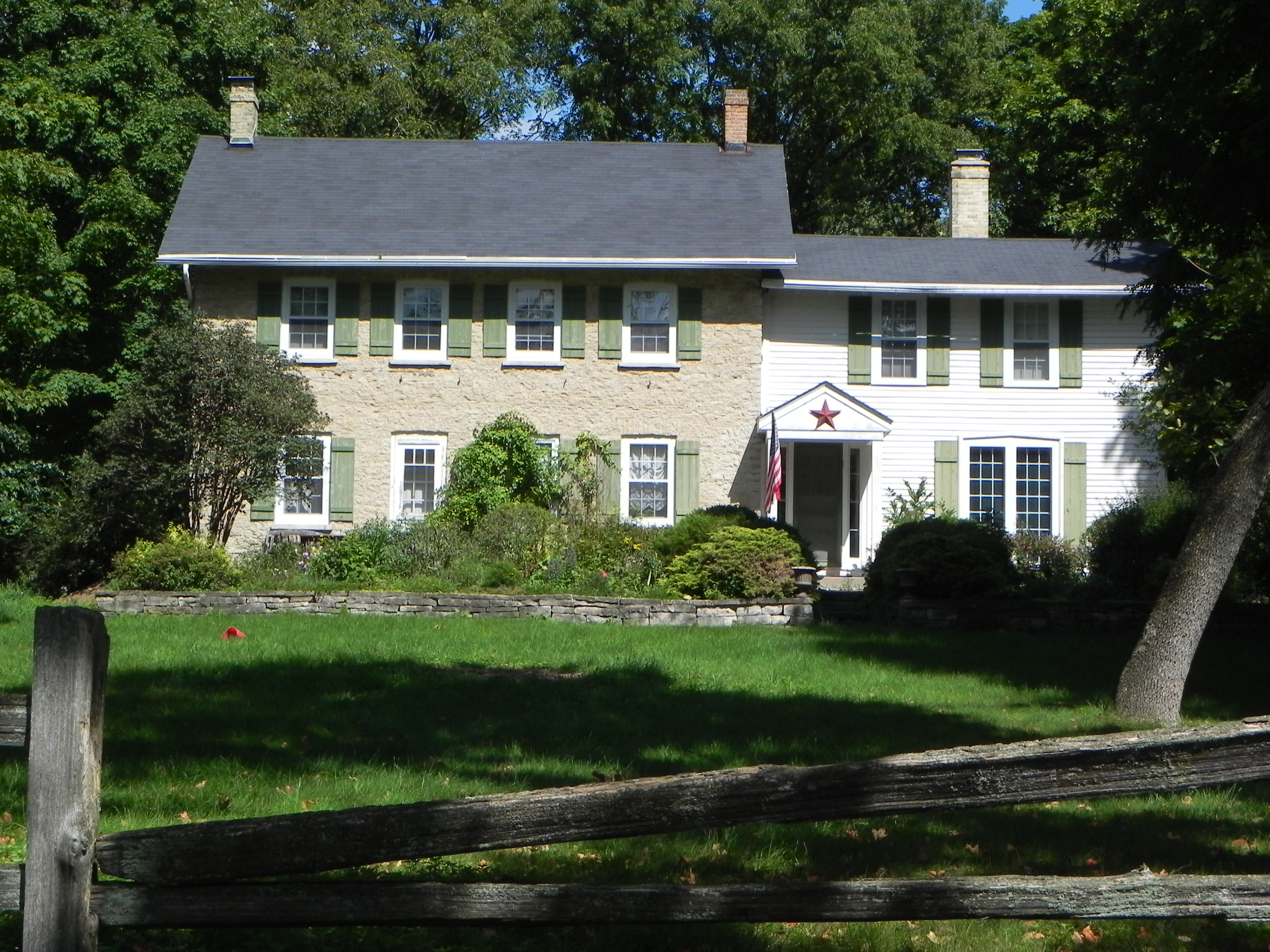

- Location within Wisconsin Location within the United States
- Location: 153 W. Oakwood Dr., Delafield, Wisconsin
- Coordinates: 43°4′23″N 88°25′6″W
- Area: 3 acres (1.2 ha)
- Built: 1870
- NRHP reference No.: 84003803
- Added to NRHP: March 1, 1984

Bishopstead was the residence of Episcopalian bishop Jackson Kemper. The house is located in Delafield, Wisconsin, and was built in 1846. It was added to the National Register of Historic Places on March 1, 1984, for its religious significance.

David Jackson Kemper was born in New York in 1789 and trained for the Episcopal ministry in Philadelphia. After ordination in 1811, he served as a missionary in then sparsely populated western Pennsylvania and Ohio for 20 years. In 1834 he was assigned to assess conditions at a mission school further west, in Green Bay. A year later, he was made the first "missionary bishop," and charged with organizing the church in Missouri and Indiana. In 1838, his mandate was expanded to include Wisconsin, Minnesota and Iowa. Kemper traveled constantly through these half-settled areas. His tasks included organizing Episcopal congregations and finding clergymen to serve them.

In 1842 Kemper established Nashotah House near Delafield, which became the Episcopal Church's western seminary. He considered building a "rather grand" home for himself on Lake Nemahbin, but decided that was too financially risky, so instead in 1846 he bought a parcel two miles from Nashotah and began to expand an already-existing building into what would become his home, Bishopstead. His wife had died before he came west, but now he brought from the east to Wisconsin Territory his two sons, his daughter, and two unmarried sisters to live with him.

That pre-existing building was probably built around 1842. Kemper added to it by the winter of 1846 and continued adding over the years. Today the west wing is a two-story stone building with a chimney at each end of the roof - suggesting Federal style. Inside, the walls are mainly plaster and the flooring is pine. The east wing is a two-story frame structure with Greek Revival stylings, and its parlor has French doors and a fireplace with a Gothic mantle. Kemper added other wings in his day.

Kemper's house was his home base as he organized the early Episcopal church in what would become states ranging from Indiana to Minnesota to Kansas. In 1859 he resigned from his post as missionary bishop, but he continued to live in this house, remained Bishop of Wisconsin, and stayed active in church affairs at the national level until he died in 1870.
