= Han Yerry =

War chief of the Oneida people

- Tewahangarahken

Oneida leader

Personal details
- Born: ca. 1724
- Died: 1794 to 1839
- Spouse(s): Tyonajanegen ("Two Kettles Together") Sarah Montour m. 1754; Dolly Cobus, m. 1774
- Children: With Sarah: Cornelius, Dolly, Jacob; With Dolly: Peter
- Known for: Fought in the Battle of Oriskany
- Nickname(s): Honyere Doxtator, and multiple spellings of his first and last name

Han Yerry, also known as Honyere Doxtator and his Oneida name, Tewahangarahken ("He Who Takes Up the Snow Shoe"; c. 1724 – 1794 to 1839), was a war chief of the Oneida people. As a child, Han Yerry lived with a German-Dutch couple, who educated him and taught him European culture. Over his life, he was a warrior, war chief, commissioned American Army officer, farmer, rancher, and caterer. He made a name for himself in the American Revolutionary War and is one of three great ancestors of Oneida people who served as commissioned officers in the war. Hon Yerry received 1,800 acres in land grants for his service.

== Early life and family ==
Johan George Dachstetter, born about 1724, was the son a Mohawk woman, (Note: Some say that he was born about 1745, but he was married and had a son Cornelius in 1754.) perhaps Catherine, and Cornelius Doxtator. (Note: Some believe him to have had a German father, but he and others in the nation believe him to be Oneida.) He was later known as Honyere Doxtator. There are many spelling of the surname, like Dachstetter and Dockstader, but Doxtator is the most common modern spelling of the surname. (Note: His name transitioned over time to "Johan, Jury, Hon Jury, Hon Yury, Honyerry, and Honyere.") His father, Cornelius Doxtator was placed with a Dutch-German family of Anna Elizabeth and George Dachstetter who taught him his lessons and how the settlers lived. His grandfather Tee-Yee-Neen-Ha-Ga-Row went to London, England in 1710 with three other Haudenosaunee chiefs.

== Revolutionary war ==
Han Yerry became a war chief of the wolf clan of the Oneida people. He was a key figure during the American Revolutionary War, considered to be one of the most influential leaders of the Oneida people. Fort Stanwix, built near the Oneida Carry on Oneida land in the present state of New York, was used as a garrison by American and British troops. The Oneida supported American troops as warriors, scouts, and spies. They helped catch deserters and provided them with information. When the British occupied the fort, the Oneida supported them.

Han Yerry, Oneida warriors, and colonial militia men fought together during the Revolutionary War against Loyalists and other members of the Haudenosaunee. The Oneida provided "the largest amount of physical support to the war" from 1777 to early 1778.

Han Yerry fought at the Saratoga campaign (June 14 – October 17, 1777), Battle of Oriskany (August 6, 1777) in New York, and Fort Stanwix (August 1777). His wife or his wives fought alongside him: Two Kettles Together, (Tyonajanegen) and Dolly Cobus are both said to have played pivotal roles in battles with him. Han Yerry, Two Kettles Together, and their son Cornelius particularly distinguished themselves at the Battle of Oriskany. Han Yerry killed nine men. He also fought with his brother Honyost and his son Peter.

Three Revolutionary War commissioned officers, John Skenandoa (Oskanondonha), Han Yerry (Tewahangarahken) or James Powless (Wakarantharaus) made their mark with future generations. Most Oneidas descend from one of these men. In 1779, Han Yerry was commissioned in the American Army as a captain. About three years later he was honorably discharged. He was a gentle man, distinguished soldier, leader, man of his word, and a hero.

== Marriages and children ==
Han Yerry was married to Tyonajanegen (Two Kettles Together), also known as Sarah Montour and Sarah Martin, in 1754. Their first child, Cornelius was born that year. Two years later, Dorthea, also known as Dolly, was born. In 1758, their son Jacob was born.

Han Yerry married for a second time to Dolly Cobus on August 20, 1774. They had a son, Peter, in 1787. Peter had seven children with his wife, Lucretia Calvin. (Note: Dolly Cobus is also said to be Polly Cooper, Cobus means cooper in the Oneida language.)

Dolly Cobus, also said to be Molly Pitcher, was said to have fought alongside her husband Han Yerry, Oneida warriors, and colonial militia men during the Revolutionary War. She was said to have loaded his musket or shot her weapon at the Saratoga campaign (June 14 – October 17, 1777), Battle of Oriskany (August 6, 1777) in New York, and Fort Stanwix (August 1777). Cobus died on July 23, 1844. Her son Peter was alive at the time. Her step-children and husband were deceased. (Note: Dolly Cobus is also said to be the same woman as Polly Cooper. Cooper and Cobus are discussed separately in the same book and article. In the story of Han Yerry's life, there's no mention of Polly Cooper or Molly Pitcher.)

== Farm and land grants ==
Han Yerry had a farm for his family at Oriska, near Fort Stanwix. The Doxtators were among the wealthiest Oneida families. The lived in a large frame house and operated a farm, livestock and poultry ranch, and an inn. Food was served on pewter plates. They grew a number of crops. The family had horses, sheep, cattle, and turkeys. There were 60 hogs and 100 chickens. In the winter, they traveled on a sleigh and a wagon.

In 1791, Han Yerry and his brother Honyost received 3,000 acres of military bounty land near the town of Junius, New York. Han Yerry received about 1,800 acres. Cobus was also said to have received land nearby in Red Springs, but it is not confirmed. The Oneida that had lots there sold them on May 26, 1809, for $23,000.

== Death ==
Han Yerry's year of death ranges from 1794 to 1839.

== Bibliography ==
- Glatthaar, Joseph T.; Martin, James Kirby (2006). Forgotten allies : the Oneida Indians and the American revolution. New York: Hill and Wang. ISBN 978-0-8090-4601-0.
- Loew, Patty (2001). Indian nations of Wisconsin : histories of endurance and renewal. Madison: Wisconsin Historical Society Press. ISBN 978-0-87020-332-9.
