= Roberta Hill Whiteman =

American poet

- Born: Roberta Hill; 1947 (age 78–79); Oneida Nation of Wisconsin
- Education: BA, creative communication, University of Wisconsin-Green Bay, an MA, University of Montana, PhD, American Studies, University of Minnesota
- Occupation: Poet
- Employer(s): University of Wisconsin-Madison, various Poets-in-the-Schools Programs
- Known for: Star Quilt (1984), Philadelphia Flowers (1996)
- Spouse: Ernest Whiteman
- Children: Jacob, Heather, and Melissa
- Relatives: Lillie Rosa Minoka Hill
- Awards: Wisconsin Idea Foundation's Excellence Award

Roberta Hill Whiteman (born 1947) is an Oneida Nation poet from Wisconsin. She is known for the collections Star Quilt (1984) and Philadelphia Flowers (1996). She received the 1991 Wisconsin Idea Foundation's Excellence Award.

== Early life and education ==
She was born Roberta Hill in 1947 into the Oneida Nation of Wisconsin. She lived with her family on the reservation and also in Green Bay, Wisconsin. Her father was a musician. She attended local schools.

Long interested in languages and story, Hill earned a BA in creative communication from the University of Wisconsin-Green Bay, an MA in fine arts from the University of Montana, and a PhD in American Studies from the University of Minnesota. Her doctoral thesis was a biography and study of her paternal grandmother, Lillie Rosa Minoka Hill, a Mohawk who was the second Native American woman to earn a medical degree in the United States. She married an Oneida man and in 1905 moved with him from Philadelphia to the Wisconsin reservation. Minoka Hill lived there for decades, operating a "kitchen clinic" in her home.

== Marriage and family ==
Hill married Ernest Whiteman, an artist. They have three children. He illustrated her first collection of poetry, Star Quilt (1984).

== Career ==
Whiteman has taught as a lecturer at numerous colleges. She has published poetry and essays on her work.

She has been an instructor for Poets-in-the-Schools Program at various locales, including Minnesota, Arizona, and Oklahoma. She is an Associate Professor of English and American Studies at the University of Wisconsin-Madison.

== Writings ==
- Star Quilt (1984/reprint 1999)
- Philadelphia Flowers (1996)
- Works included in Carriers of the Dream Wheel: Contemporary Native American Poetry, edited by Duane Niatum, Harper, 1975; The Third Woman: Minority Women Writers of the United States, edited by Dexter Fisher, Houghton, 1980; and Harper's Anthology of Twentieth Century Native American Poetry, edited by Niatum, Harper, 1988.
- Dr. Lillie Rosa Minoka-Hill: Mohawk Woman Physician, University of Minnesota, 1998 (biography of her grandmother)
