= Augusta de Grasse Stevens =

American novelist and journalist

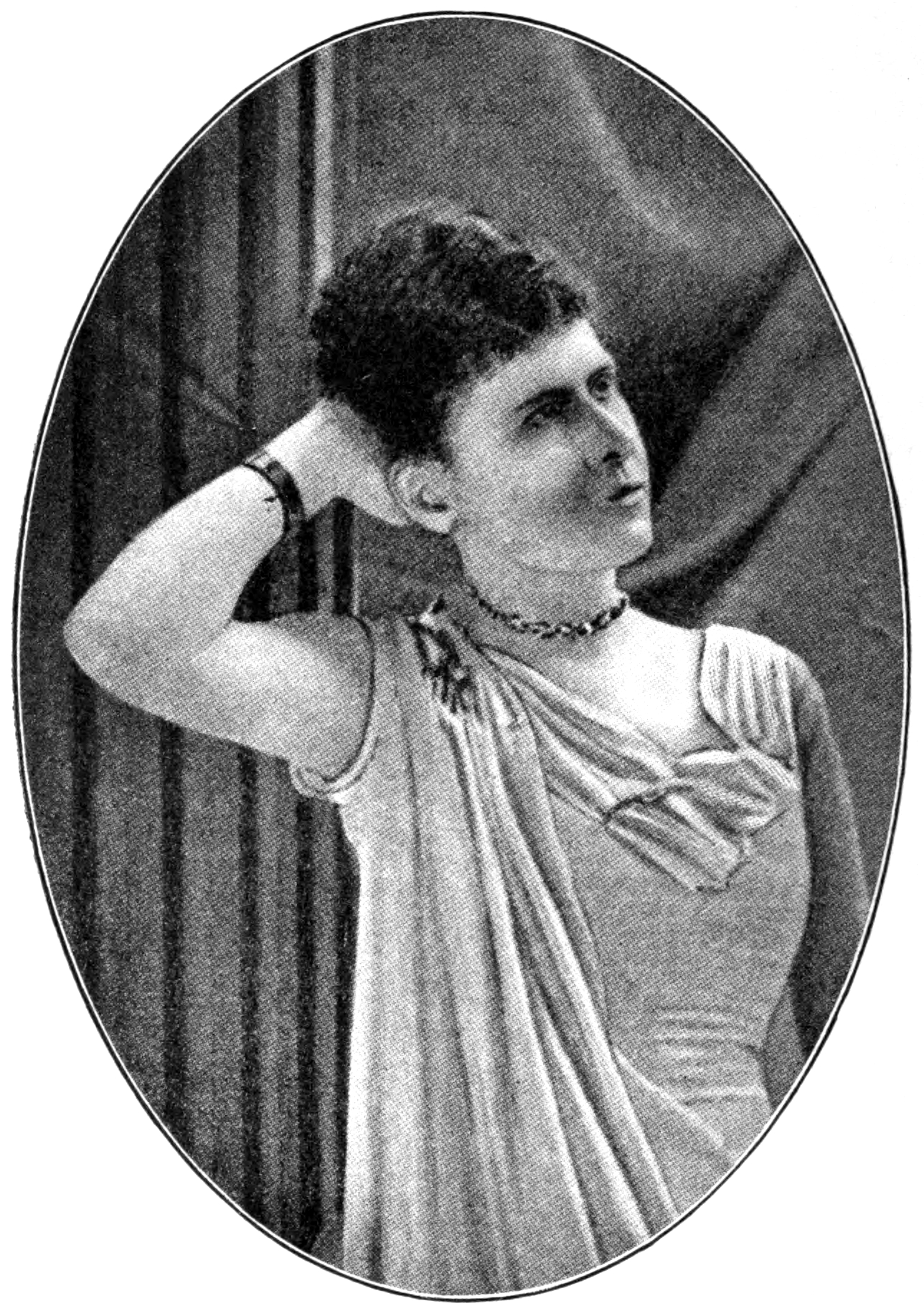
- Augusta de Grasse Stevens
- Born: Augusta de Grasse Stevens; 1852; Albany, New York, United States
- Died: October 10, 1894 (aged 41–42); Brussels, Belgium
- Occupations: Novelist, journalist, art critic

Augusta de Grasse Stevens (1852 – 10 October 1894) was an American novelist, journalist, and art critic. Based primarily in London during her literary career, she reported on the London art world for The New York Times and contributed fiction and journalism to British and American periodicals. She was the author of Old Boston (1884), The Lost Dauphin (1887), and Miss Hildreth (1888).

== Early life ==
Augusta de Grasse Stevens was born in 1852 in Albany, New York, the daughter of Samuel S. Stevens, a patent attorney, and Mary Frances Smith Stevens. Stevens's father died when she was young, and she moved with her mother and sister to her grandfather's home in Rochester, New York. Six years after her father's death, Stevens's mother remarried. After this marriage, the family traveled extensively in Europe. Stevens was homeschooled by her mother and a personal tutor.

== Career ==
Stevens's first book was a novella titled Distance, which was published when she was 17. Stevens then moved into journalism and reported on the London art scene for The New York Times for ten years often signing her work "A. De G. S." In this role, she was resented by novelist Harold Frederic, who later satirized her as Miss Timby-Hucks in Mrs. Albert Grundy: Observations in Philistia (1896).

Stevens published her first full novel, Old Boston, in 1884. A historical romance about the American Revolutionary War, it was first published in three volumes and later released as a single volume. A contemporary review in The Publishers' Circular praised the book as interesting "from first page to last" and called Stevens an author with "high promise and culture." Her next book, The Lost Dauphin (1887), concerned Eleazer Williams' claim to be the "lost dauphin", Louis XVII. Stevens's final novel, Miss Hildreth (1888), combined romance with Russian political intrigue. In the story, a character accuses Helena Blavatsky of being a Russian spy, an accusation the real Blavatsky denied and called libelous.

Stevens also wrote short stories for popular periodicals, such as Harper's Magazine. According to Helen C. Black, Stevens's short story "Weighed in the Balance" when published in Chapman's Magazine of Fiction resulted in over 100,000 copies of the magazine being sold. In addition to her fiction, Stevens continued her career as a journalist. She wrote weekly articles for American news syndicates as well as articles on request for the Saturday Review. Stevens was on the Argosy staff and served as art editor for the Novel Review.

Following the death of her stepfather, Stevens and her mother moved permanently to London, England, where her sister Marie lived with her husband, Sir Francis Evans, 1st Baronet. Stevens died on 10 October 1894 in Brussels, Belgium.

== Bibliography ==
- Old Boston: A Romance of the War of Independence. 3 vol. London: Sampson Low, 1884.
- The Lost Dauphin: Louis XVII or Onwarenhiiaki the Indian Iroquois Chief. Kent: George Allen, 1887.
- Miss Hildreth: A Novel. 3 vol. London: Ward and Downey, 1888.
