= Tyonajanegen =

Oneida female warrior

Tyonajanegen ("Two Kettles Together")

Oneida leader

Personal details
- Spouse: Han Yerry Tewahangarahken ("He Who Takes Up the Snow Shoe") Also known as Honyery Doxtator
- Children: Cornelius, Dolly, Peter, Jacob
- Known for: Fought in the Battle of Oriskany

Tyonajanegen ("Two Kettles Together") was an Oneida woman who fought in the August 6, 1777 Battle of Oriskany during the American Revolutionary War. Armed with two pistols, she rode into battle and fought alongside her husband, Han Yerry, and her son, Cornelius. Tyonajanegen helped her husband reload his gun after a musket ball struck him in the wrist. After the battle she rode on horseback to bring news of the outcome to local rebels and Indians.

An article in the September 3, 1777 Pennsylvania Journal and Weekly Advertiser described the incident.

... a friendly Indian, with his wife and son, who distinguished themselves remarkably on the occasion. The Indian killed nine of the enemy, when having receiv[ed] a ball through his wrist that disabled him from using his gun, he then fought with his tomahawk. His son killed two, and his wife on horseback, fought by his side, with pistols during the whole action, which lasted six hours.

Han Yerry was a head warrior throughout the Saratoga campaign and was assisted by Tyonajanegen who transported messages for the rebels. General Horatio Gates ordered Colonel Peter Gansevoort to "deliver to her Three Gallons of Rum, for a Winter's supply for her Family" as a reward for her services.

In the 1750s, Tyonajanegen married Han Yerry Tewahangarahken ("He Who Takes Up the Snow Shoe"), a chief warrior of the Wolf Clan. The couple settled and helped found Oriska, an Oneida village near the mouth of the Oriskany Creek. The couple had three sons and a daughter and prospered on an expansive farm; Han Yerry having become one of the wealthiest Oneida. By 1777, the family had a frame house, a barn, wagon and sleigh. They grew a variety of crops and raised livestock and other animals including 15 horses, 100 chickens, 60 hogs, six turkeys, six cattle and two sheep. Tyonajanegen cooked meals in kettles made of brass and copper and served guests on pewter plates. The family catered to people from the nearby Fort Stanwix as well as travelers.

After the Battle of Oriskany, a pro-British Haudenosaunee war party attacked Oriska, destroying the village and the family's house and belongings.

Han Yerry died sometime prior to November 1794. One account relates that Tyonajanegen went blind before she died circa 1822.

Much of what is known of Tyonajanegan is taken from the manuscripts of Lyman Draper, a 19th-century historian.

"Hon Yerry's wife was Sarah Martin – taken prisoner with her sister Katy from the Shawanoes, & remained with the Mohawks."
