= Oneida, Wisconsin =

- Unincorporated community
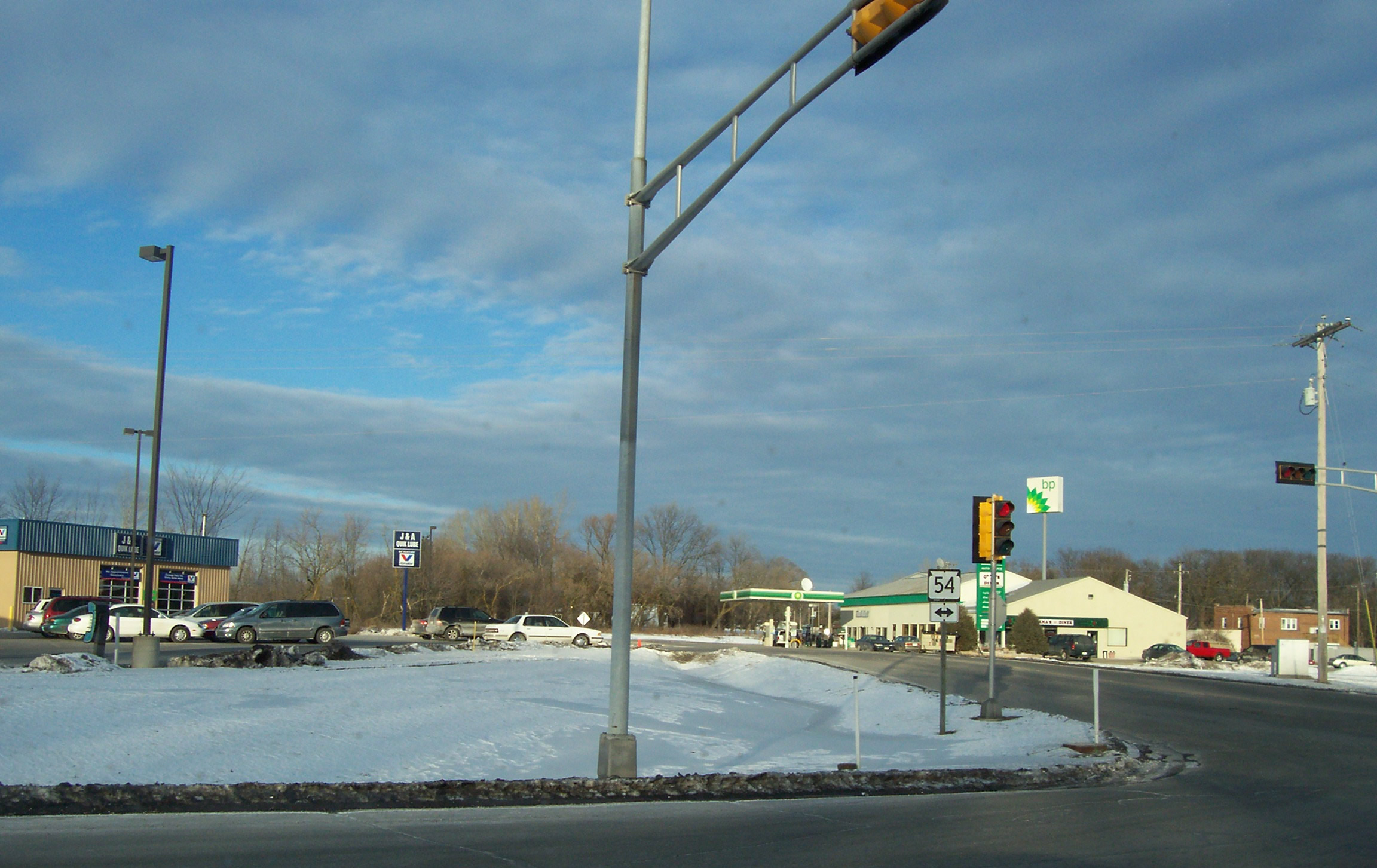

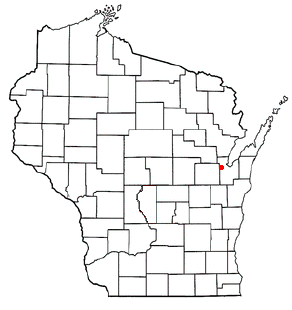
- Location of Oneida, Wisconsin
- Coordinates: 44°29′55″N 88°10′58″W
- Country: United States
- State: Wisconsin
- County: Outagamie

Area
  - Total: 60.8 sq mi (157.6 km^{2})
  - Land: 60.8 sq mi (157.5 km^{2})
  - Water: 0 sq mi (0.0 km^{2})
- Elevation: 679 ft (207 m)

Population (2000)
  - Total: 4,001
  - Density: 66/sq mi (25.4/km^{2})
- Time zone: UTC-6 (Central (CST))
  - Summer (DST): UTC-5 (CDT)
- FIPS code: 55-59975
- GNIS feature ID: 1570830

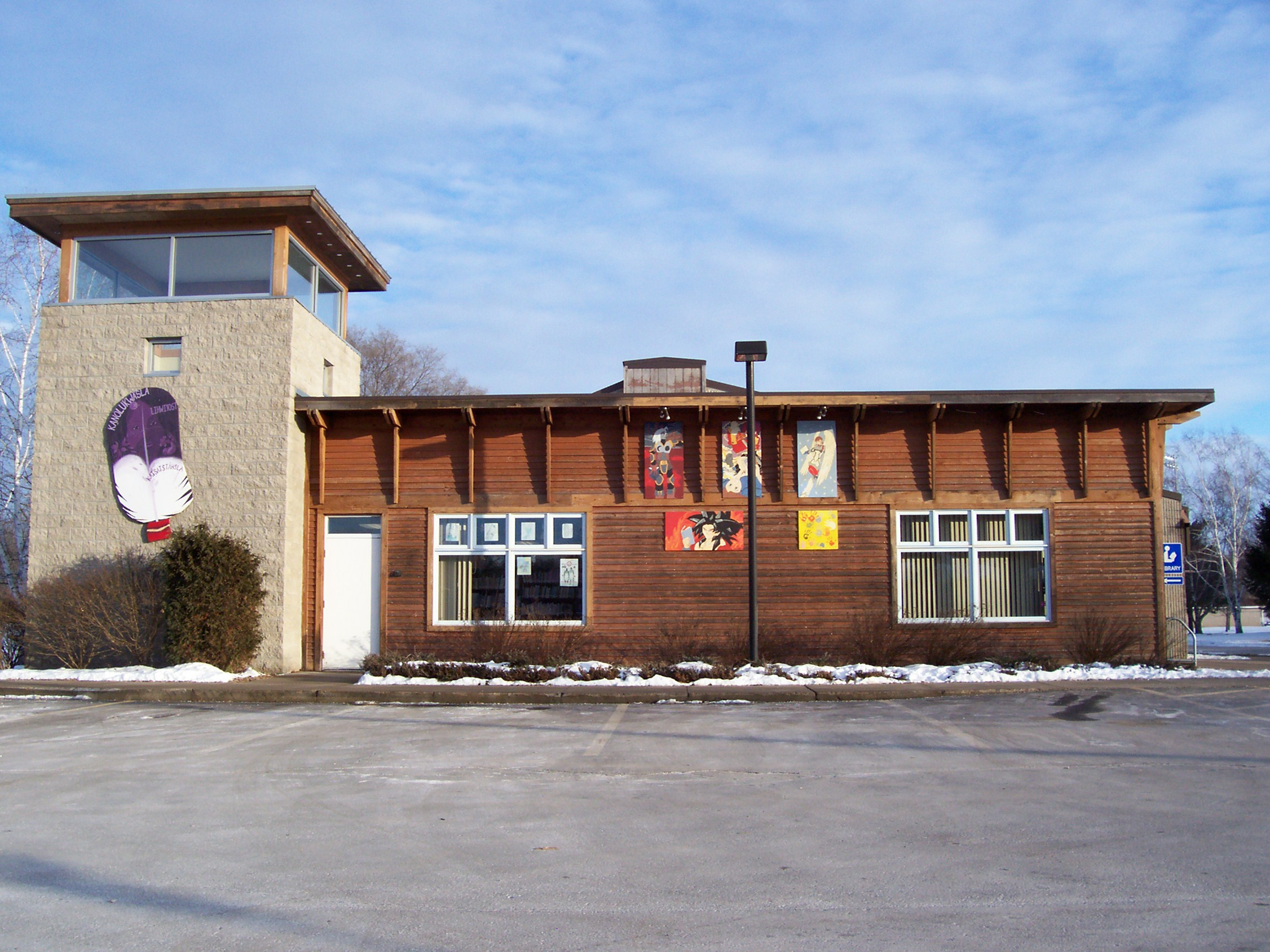
The Oneida Community Library

Oneida is an unincorporated community and former census-designated place (CDP) in the Town of Oneida, Outagamie County, Wisconsin, United States. The population was 1,070 at the 2000 census. At that time, part of the CDP lay within the Town of Hobart, which has since incorporated as a village, in adjacent Brown County. Oneida is located on Wisconsin Highway 54.

The community lies near the center of the reservation of the federally recognized Oneida Nation of Wisconsin, for which it is named.

== Geography ==
Oneida is located at 44°29′46″N 88°11′18″W (44.496192, -88.188278).

According to the United States Census Bureau, the CDP has a total area of 5.7 square miles (15 km^{2}), of which 5.7 square miles (15 km^{2}) is land and 0.1 square miles (0.26 km^{2}) (1.05%) is water.

== Demographics ==
As of the census of 2000, there were 1,070 people, 359 households, and 250 families residing in the CDP. The population density was 189.3 people per square mile (73.1 people/km^{2}). There were 383 housing units at an average density of 67.7 units per square mile (26.1 units/km^{2}). The racial makeup of the CDP was 31.03% White, 0.28% African American, 65.89% Native American, 0.09% Asian, 0.09% Pacific Islander, 0.28% from other races, and 2.34% from two or more races. Hispanic or Latino of any race were 3.36% of the population. At 55.23% Iroquois, Oneida is the most Iroquois town in the United States.

There were 359 households, out of which 37.3% had children under the age of 18 living with them, 46.0% were married couples living together, 16.7% had a female householder with no husband present, and 30.1% were non-families. 25.3% of all households were made up of individuals, and 13.4% had someone living alone who was 65 years of age or older. The average household size was 2.98 and the average family size was 3.62.

In the CDP, the population was spread out, with 35.2% under the age of 18, 6.6% from 18 to 24, 26.4% from 25 to 44, 21.0% from 45 to 64, and 10.7% who were 65 years of age or older. The median age was 33 years. For every 100 females, there were 88.7 males. For every 100 females age 18 and over, there were 82.8 males.

The median income for a household in the CDP was $31,588, and the median income for a family was $35,288. Males had a median income of $29,079 versus $21,983 for females. The per capita income for the CDP was $13,766. About 18.3% of families and 18.5% of the population were below the poverty line, including 19.8% of those under age 18 and 47.8% of those age 65 or over.

== Churches ==
- The Church of the Holy Apostles
- Oneida United Methodist Church

== Education ==
- Oneida Nation School System, a tribal K-12 school, is in Oneida.
- The College of Menominee Nation, a tribally-operated college, has a campus in Oneida.

== Notable people ==
- Charlie Hill, a comedian and actor, lived in Oneida.
- Cornelius Hill, Oneida chief
- Lillie Rosa Minoka Hill, Mohawk physician who was the second female American Indian doctor in the United States
