= Jackson Kemper =

American bishop

The Right Reverend Jackson Kemper D.D., LL.D.
- Bishop of Wisconsin
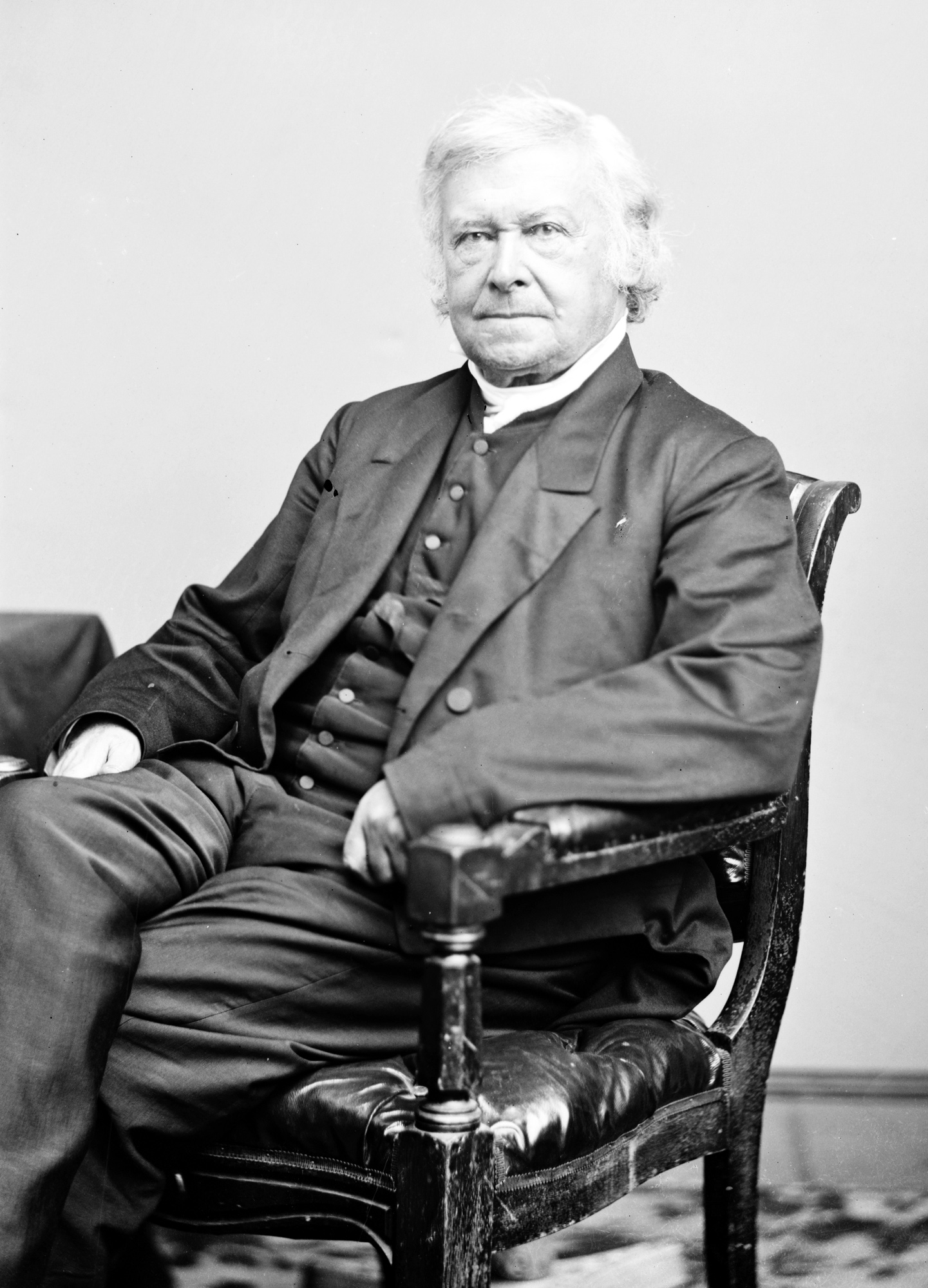
- Church: Episcopal Church
- Diocese: Wisconsin
- Elected: 1859
- In office: 1859–1870
- Successor: William Edmond Armitage
- Previous post: Missionary Bishop (1835-1859)

Orders
- Ordination: January 23, 1814 by William White
- Consecration: September 25, 1835 by William White

Personal details
- Born: December 24, 1789 Pleasant Valley, Dutchess County, New York, United States
- Died: May 24, 1870 (aged 80) Nashotah, Wisconsin, United States
- Buried: Nashotah House Cemetery
- Denomination: Anglican
- Parents: Daniel Kemper & Elizabeth Marius
- Spouse: Jerusha Lyman (m. 1816; d. 1818); Ann Relf (m. 1821; d. 1832)
- Education: Columbia College

Sainthood
- Feast day: May 24
- Venerated in: Episcopal Church

Jackson Kemper (December 24, 1789 – May 24, 1870) in 1835 became the first missionary bishop of the Episcopal Church in the United States of America. Especially known for his work with Native American peoples, he also founded parishes in what in his youth was considered the Northwest Territory and later became known as the "Old Northwest" (Indiana, Missouri, Wisconsin, Minnesota and Nebraska), hence one appellation as bishop of the "Whole Northwest". Bishop Kemper founded Nashotah House and Racine College in Wisconsin, and from 1859 until his death served as the first bishop of the Episcopal Diocese of Wisconsin.

== Early life ==
Baptized David Jackson Kemper by Dr. Benjamin Moore, the Assistant Rector of his parents' congregation at New York City's Trinity Church, he would eventually drop the given name "David". He had been born in the Hudson River Valley of New York, where his parents had taken temporary refuge during a smallpox outbreak in New York City. His father Daniel Kemper had been a Deputy Clothier-General in the Continental Army during the American Revolution. His mother, Elizabeth (Marius) Kemper, descended from well-known families of the Dutch New Amsterdam era.

Kemper entered Columbia College at the age of fifteen, where he studied theology under Dr. John Henry Hobart and graduated in 1809 as the valedictorian of his class. At Columbia, Jackson Kemper was a member of the Philolexian Society.

== Career ==
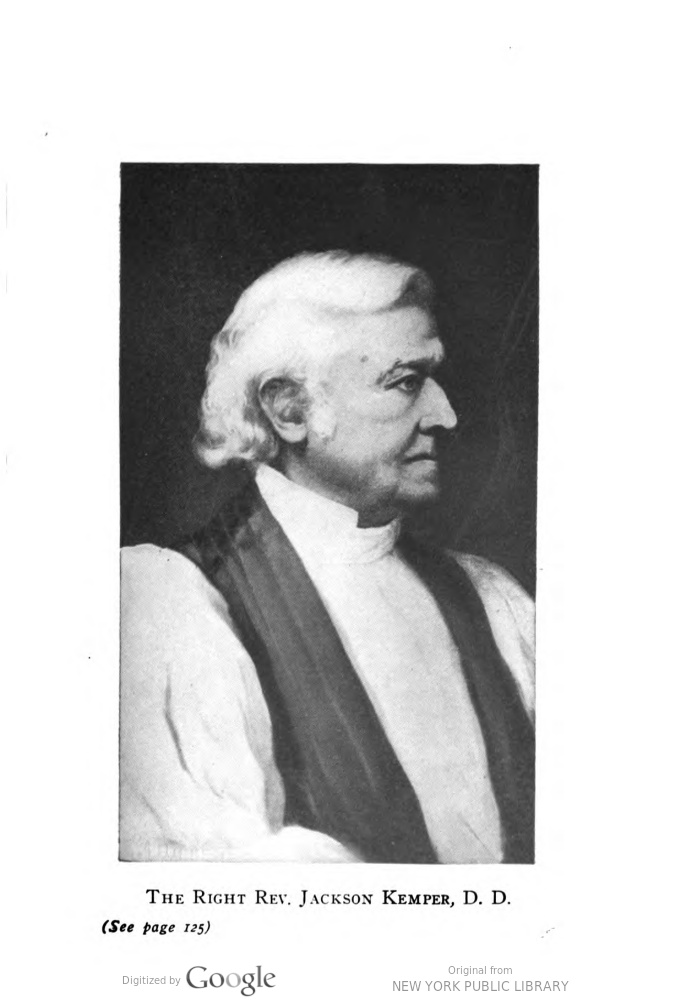
Jackson Kemper

Relocating to Philadelphia, Kemper was ordained a deacon of the Episcopal Church in 1811 by Bishop William White, and a priest in 1814 as he served at Christ Church. Particularly interested in evangelism, Kemper even persuaded his elderly mentor to make a missionary journey to western Pennsylvania during which also he founded St. Matthew's Episcopal Church in Wheeling, West Virginia.

In 1835, the Episcopal Church's General Convention decided to consecrate missionary bishops to preach the Gospel west of the settled areas. Fr. Kemper was the first chosen. After being consecrated as a bishop he promptly headed west for Indiana and Missouri. Since most clergy who had lived all their lives in the settled East were slow to respond to his call to join him on the frontier, Kemper determined to recruit priests from among men already in the West. He established a training college in St. Louis, Missouri, for that purpose, which failed in 1845 for lack of funding. He went on to found Nashotah House in 1842 and Racine College in Wisconsin. Kemper also founded the mission parish that became All Saints Cathedral in Milwaukee.

Kemper constantly urged outreach to the Native American peoples, and translations of the Scriptures and the services of the Church into their languages. His first official act as Missionary Bishop, in what would become Wisconsin, was laying the cornerstone for a new frame church building for Hobart Church, Duck Creek, which served the Oneida Indian Mission. Perhaps more significantly, the first ordinations in what would become Wisconsin were also at Hobart Church. There Kemper ordained William Adams and James Lloyd Breck, two young recruits from the East who helped him establish Nashotah House Seminary, on October 9, 1842. He was regularly invited to the Oneida reservation at Duck Creek by chief Daniel Bread. Kemper ordained a Native American, Enmegahbowh, of the Ottawa tribe as a deacon in 1859.

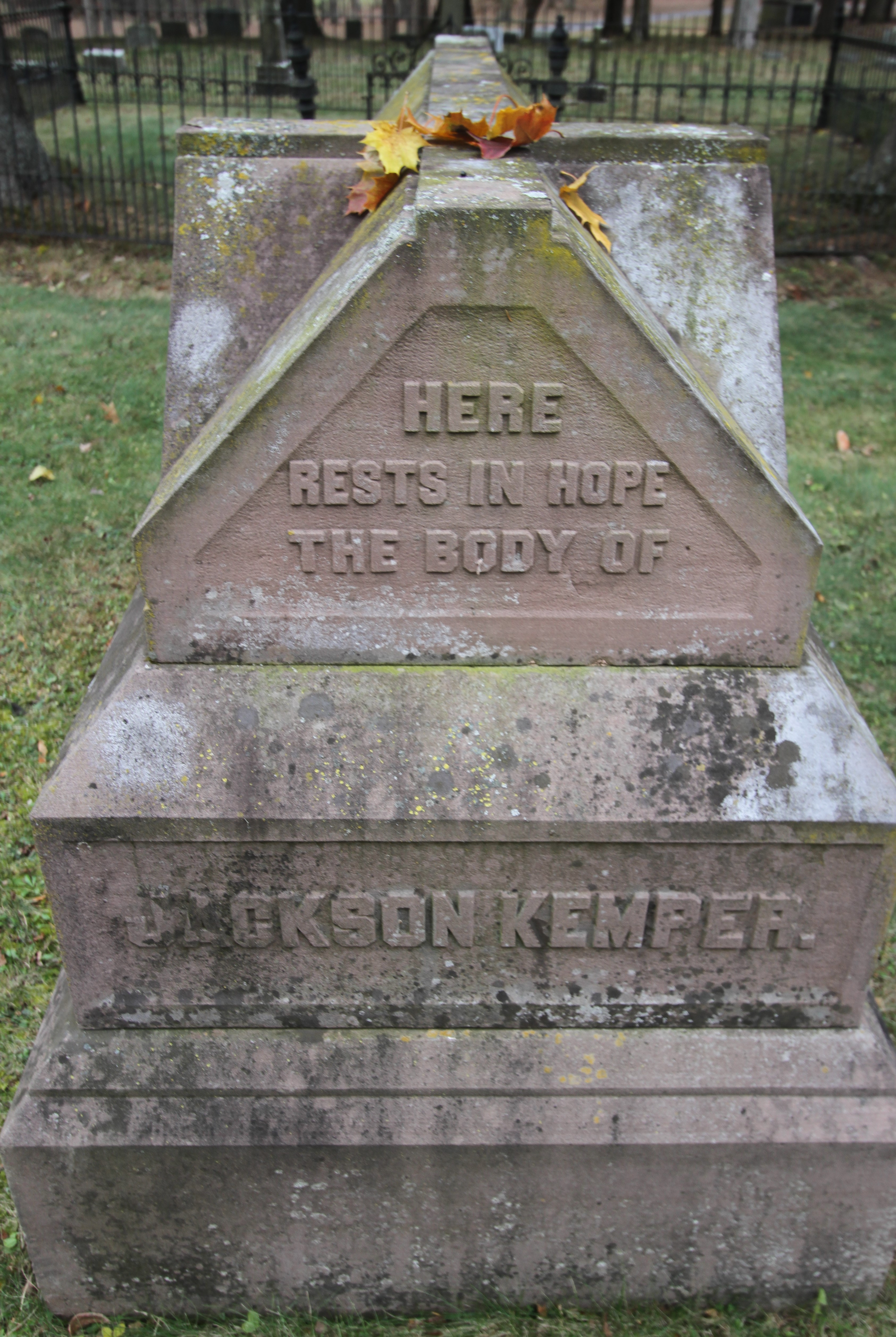
Kemper's tomb at Nashotah House

Kemper supported the Oxford Movement, although he maintained the importance of separation from the Roman Catholic Church. He ordained James De Koven as a priest in 1855, and supported Benjamin Onderdonk during his trial. In 1846 Kemper purchased a property adjacent to Nashotah House where he lived the rest of his life. From 1847 until 1854, Kemper served as Provisional Bishop of the newly formed Diocese of Wisconsin, and then served as its diocesan bishop from 1854 until his death in 1870. Kemper also supported creation of a new diocese, though he did not live to see the formation of the Diocese of Fond du Lac come to fruition.

Bishopstead, his residence in Delafield, Wisconsin, is listed on the National Register of Historic Places. Kemper Hall, an Episcopal school for girls in Kenosha, Wisconsin that was named after him, is also listed on the National Register.

== Veneration ==
Kemper is honored with a feast day on the liturgical calendar of the Episcopal Church (USA) and of the Anglican Church in North America on May 24. Nashotah House and now the Anglican Province of America have mission funds named after the missionary bishop.

== Sources ==
- From the Episcopal Calendar
- Documents by and about Jackson Kemper from Project Canterbury
- "Bishop Jackson Kemper and the Northwest Mission," by Katharine Jeanee Gallagher (University of Wisconsin at Madison, Ph.D. diss, 1915; on Internet Archive)
- A History of the Episcopal Church by Robert W. Prichard, (Harrisburg, PA: Morehouse Pub., 1999)
- The Story of a College by James DeKoven, (Middletown, Conn., 1862)
- The Catholic Movement in the American Episcopal Church by George E. DeMille, (Philadelphia: Church Historical Society, 1941)
- The Story of Nashotah by John H Egar (Milwaukee: Burdick & Armitage, 1874)
- The Life of Reverend James De Koven D.D.: Sometime Warden of Racine College by William Cox Pope, (New York: James Pott & Company, 1899)
- Apostle of the Wilderness by James Lloyd Breck, Edited by Charles Henery (Nashotah reprint, 1992)
- A Sketch-book of the American Episcopate by Hermon Griswold Batterson (Philadelphia: Lippincott, 1878)
- Todd Ewald, Jackson Kemper and his Missionary Episcopate (Church Divinity School of the Pacific, 1948)
