= Daniel Bread =

Oneida political and cultural leader

- Tekaya-tilu, Tega-wir-tiron ("Learning Body")
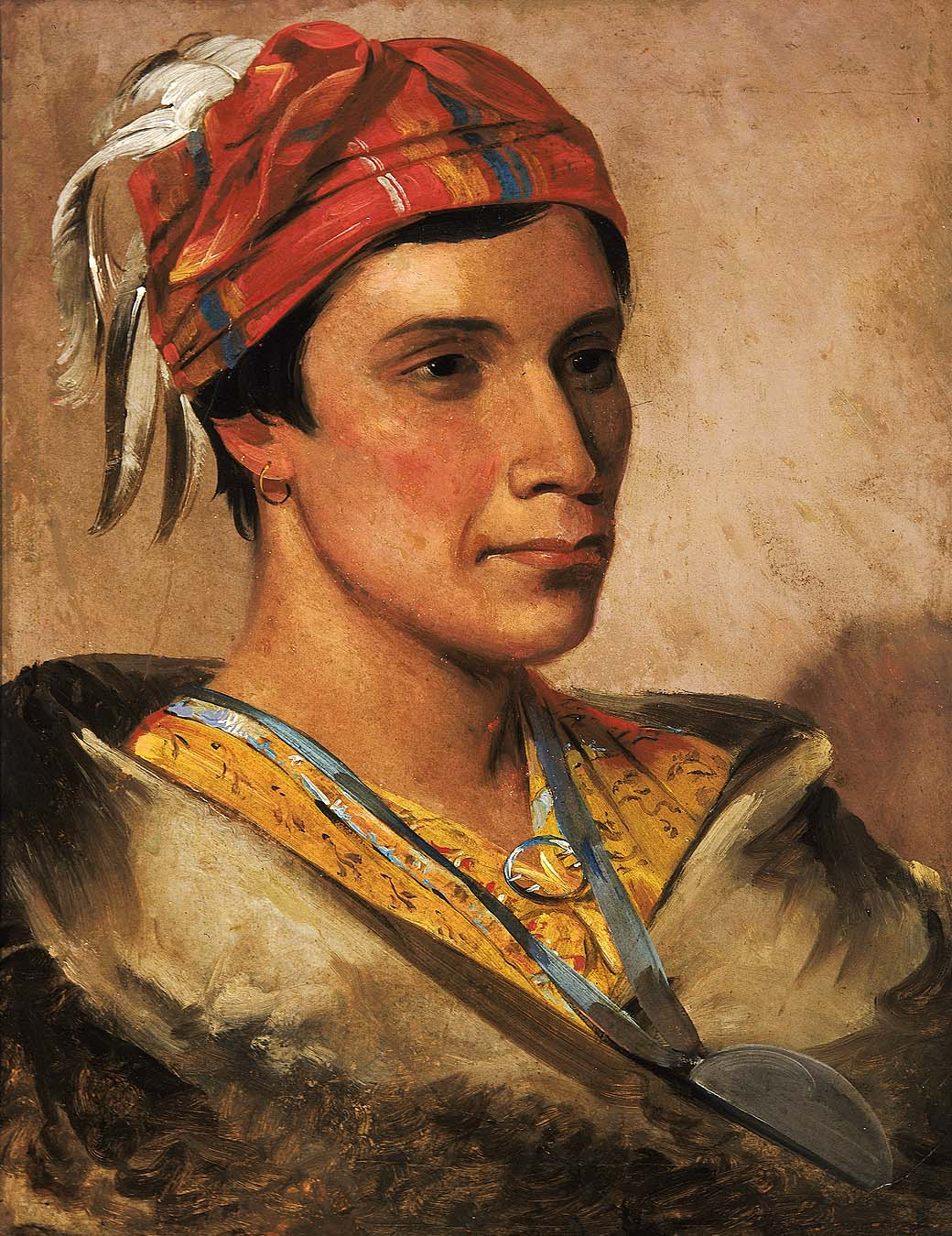
- Daniel Bread, Chief of the Oneida, 1831

Oneida leader

Personal details
- Born: March 27, 1800 Oneida Castle, New York
- Died: July 23, 1873 (aged 73)
- Cause of death: Bilious fever
- Party: First Christian
- Known for: principal chief of the Oneida people

Daniel Bread (March 27, 1800 – July 23, 1873) was an Oneida political and cultural leader who helped the Oneida preserve their culture while adapting to new realities during their transplantation from New York to Wisconsin (known then as Michigan Territory). He was frequently described as a "principal chief", "head chief", or "sachem" by the Oneida but held no hereditary position and was not an officially condoled chief. Bread was a pragmatist who found ways to compromise between "promoting tribal sovereignty and treaty rights" and cooperating with federal and state officials. He played a major role in adapting the Haudenosaunee condolence ceremony into a July 4 celebration that recognized the alliance of the Oneida with George Washington during the American Revolution. At age 14, Bread was part of the defense of Sackets Harbor during the Battle of Big Sandy Creek.

== Early life ==
Daniel Bread was the son of Dinah Bread and an Oneida named Williams; however his biological father died. He was renamed after his stepfather, Daniel Bread. He had at least one sister.

Little is known about Daniel Bread's early life, but historian Laurence Hauptman reports he spent time in the Oneida reservation's Presbyterian mission school founded by Samuel Kirkland, learning to read and write English, arithmetic, and the Christian catechism. Bread also likely learned a great deal from tales told by Oneida council leaders. He would also have had the opportunity to observe the spokesman for the First Christian party, Skenandoa, lose influence among the Oneida by signing away many of the Oneida lands over to the state in the 1780s and 1790s. Bread's tribe was subject to yellow fever, tuberculosis, and alcohol-related problems during his youth.

== Oneida resettlement to Wisconsin ==
A Canadian clergyman of Mohawk descent, Eleazer Williams, became an Episcopalian missionary to the Oneida in 1817. Williams proposed that the Haudenosaunee move from New York to Michigan Territory, and led delegations to Green Bay to negotiate treaties with the Menominee and Ho-Chunk (Winnebago) tribes that secured land along Duck Creek, Wisconsin and in the Fox River Valley at Little Chute. It was in this context that Daniel Bread worked to find consensus among a highly divided Oneida community and prevent the Oneidas from being moved again. Historians Laurence Hauptman and Gordon McLester credit him with being "the Indian most responsible for the overall administration of the move to Michigan Territory".

In 1831, Bread and other Indians travelled to Washington to challenge reductions in Oneida lands brought by the 1827 Treaty of Butte Morts and the 1831 Treaty of Washington. There they met with Secretary of War Lewis Cass, former governor of Michigan Territory. Along with George B. Porter, governor of Michigan Territory, they met with President Andrew Jackson at the White House, where Bread explained the 1831 treaty's provision for the Oneida was not "sufficient in quality or quantity" for the tribe. Jackson accepted Bread's alternative proposal to exchange lands for other, "more fertile" lands in the southern part of Menominee Territory.

In the 1830s, Bread continued his efforts to collaborate within his tribe and find compromises between tribal and federal agendas. In 1834, Oneida chief Jacob Cornelius arrived in the area with his followers (the Orchard Party) and became a political rival to Bread. Bread's party (the First Christian party) and the Orchard Party operated separately on the Oneida reservation, with their own chiefs, church, schools, and lacrosse teams, but the two men allied to argue for federal payments due from the Treaty of Canandaigua, Treaty of Buffalo Creek, and state relief funds from New York State. In 1836, the two men signed the Oneida Treaty of Washington which claimed separate treatment for the Oneida from the Menominee and granted the Oneida a distinct 65,420-acre tract.

== Principal chief ==
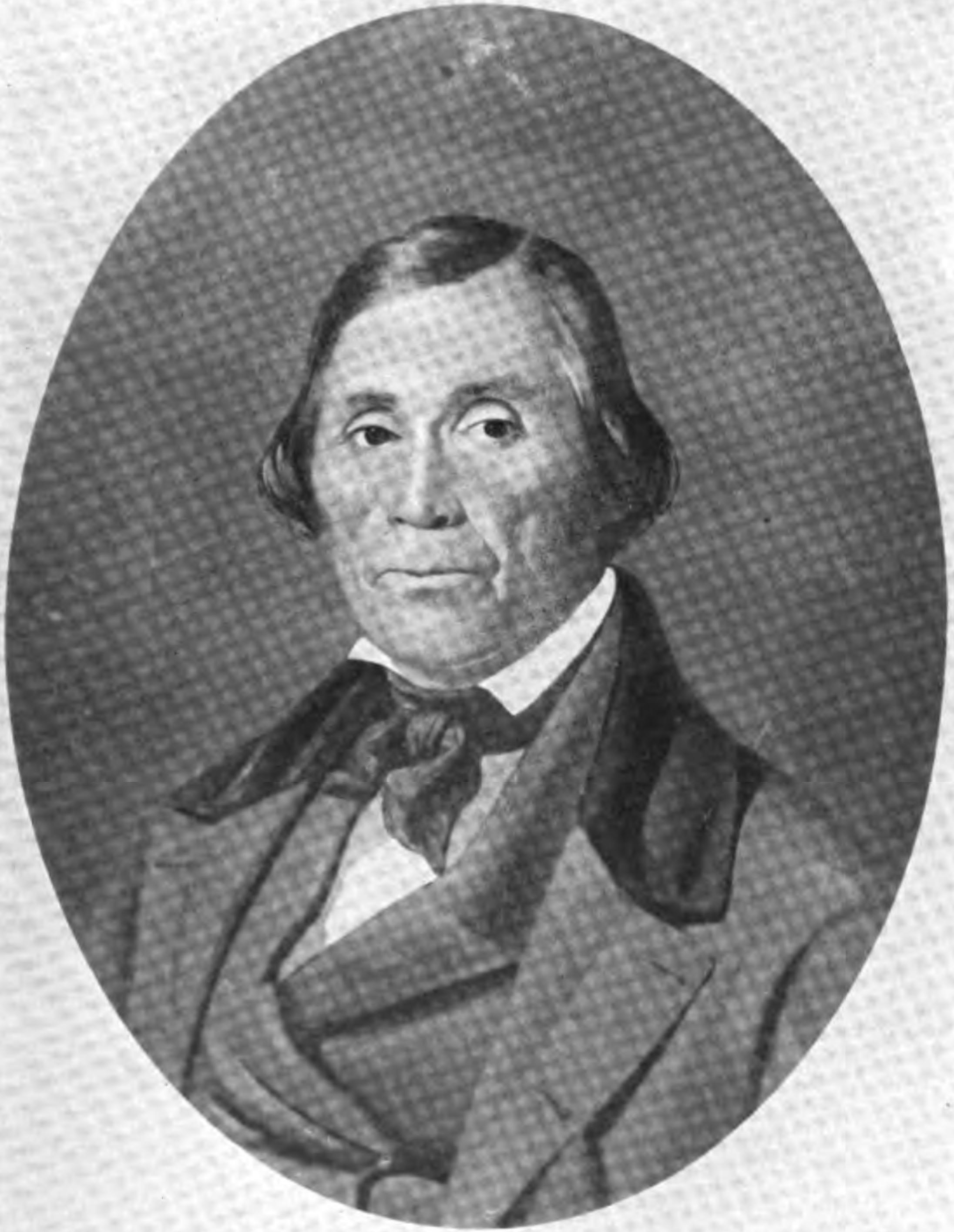
Portrait of Bread from History of Brown County, Wisconsin, Vol. 1

Bread became principal chief of the Wisconsin Oneidas in 1832. He was an active member of the Hobart Church (Episcopal), serving as choir member and lay reader. He achieved financial success running a blacksmith shop, shoe shop, and merchandise store, and lived in a three-story house.

Bread led the tribe to adapt the Haudenosaunee condolence ceremony into an annual commemoration of Independence Day, to which Oneida chiefs invited guests from the white community. The day's events featured speeches by Oneida chiefs, lacrosse matches, social dancing, fireworks, and meals served by both the Methodist and Episcopal churches. The annual Oneida pow-wow is still celebrated on July 4 to this day.

== Critics ==
Bread was criticized for being too friendly to the white man because of his support for missionary schools, acculturation, and for becoming a U.S. citizen. Some accused Bread of using political connections and power to benefit himself financially, taking payments from the government.

== Later life ==
After the American Civil War, Bread helped Indian families apply for pensions, and aided widows and orphans. In 1867, he became guardian to a teenager, Sallie Anthony, whose father had died in military service.

Chief Bread's leadership had largely collapsed by the fall of 1869. Historians Hauptman and McLester ascribe this to losing influence with federal Indian agents and with the Episcopal Church hierarchy in Wisconsin. According to the federal Indian agent W. R. Bourne, Bread had stopped attending church and "deserted his party". Bread's friend bishop Jackson Kemper died in 1870, and the Episcopal missionary Edward A. Goodnough had become more powerful in Oneida Nation politics. In 1865, Bread and First Christian Party Chief Adam Swamp had written to Washington asking for Goodnough's dismissal. Furthermore, Bread had renewed attempts to cooperate with Chief Jacob Cornelius and the Orchard party to protect the tribe's timber resources. Meanwhile, hereditary Oneida chief Cornelius Hill, who was allied with Goodnough, was growing in power.

Bread died of "bilious fever" on July 23, 1873. His granddaughter, Laura Cornelius Kellogg, would go on to found the Society of American Indians and continue to advocate for the Oneida and Haudenosaunee people.
