= Joseph Nash McDowell =

American physician (1805–1868)

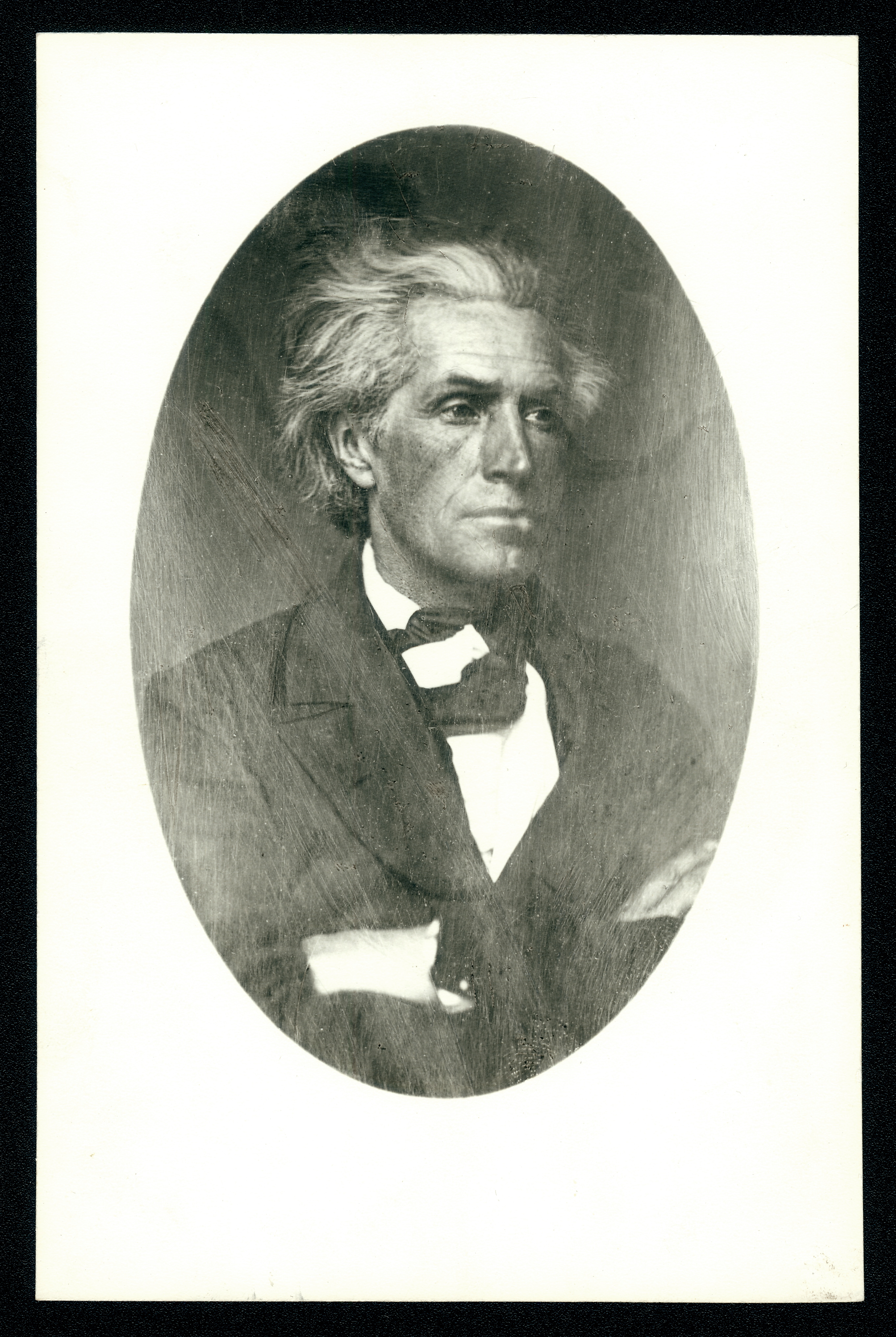
Copy of a photograph of Joseph McDowell

Joseph Nash McDowell (1805–1868) was an American medical doctor primarily remembered for his grave-digging practices, where he illegally exhumed corpses in order to study human anatomy. He is also known for his influence on Mark Twain, and was likely the inspiration for Twain's fictional character Dr. Robinson in The Adventures of Tom Sawyer.

== Early career ==
McDowell moved to St. Louis in 1839 with a reputation that preceded him. He had previously worked in Kentucky, Philadelphia, and Ohio at various medical facilities, and studied at Transylvania University in Kentucky. In 1840, he founded the medical department at Kemper College in St. Louis, which became Missouri Medical College after Kemper's dissolution in 1845. After McDowell's death, his medical school eventually became affiliated with the Washington University School of Medicine in 1899.

== Collecting corpses ==
In the 1840s, using cadavers to study human anatomy was a highly uncommon and frowned upon practice in the United States. Prior to the American Civil War, only five states allowed the dissection of non-felons for medical and educational purposes. Three of these laws were soon repealed, leaving the practice legal in only the states of New York and Massachusetts. Dissecting cadavers was crucial to gain a comprehensive understanding of human anatomy and to enhance and develop more accurate medical practices; however, the public was wary of the idea, believing it to be a desecration of the dead. In large part, this feeling was due to religious reasons; Christianity, for example, calls for burial of the dead. Exhuming the dead was not only disrespectful but could also be considered sacrilegious; it was believed a body needed to be intact to enter Heaven.

McDowell believed dissection of cadavers was necessary to advance the medical field and also his own understanding of the human body. During his time teaching at the medical school, he not only encouraged but also required his students to perform at least one human dissection before their graduation. This illegal practice served as a form of bonding for the students; with the practice being strictly taboo to most of society, the students had only each other with which to discuss what they had done and how it impacted their education.

== Rumors and folklore ==
There had been "anatomy riots" across America in the 1840s: a public, outraged by allegations of body-snatching, angrily targeted medical schools. One of the largest demonstrations had been in St. Louis after locals had found discarded remains of several dissected cadavers in an open pit behind St. Louis University. Five years later in 1849, a mob stormed Dr. McDowell’s Missouri Medical College, after the family of a girl whom McDowell had previously attended suspected him of later stealing her corpse from its grave. They were correct: McDowell had been determined to learn more of what caused her death, but upon receiving a tip-off note warning of the raid, he successfully hid the body, guided (he claimed) by a vision of his dead mother While never actually caught in the act, it was common knowledge in St. Louis that McDowell and his medical students were exhuming the recently dead in order to dissect the bodies. Rumors spread and he later became known as "Mad Doctor McDowell."

September 11 of the same year, suspicion again fell on McDowell after the disappearance of a woman last seen walking her dog in the vicinity of the Missouri Medical College. Being the wife of a prominent German-American businessman, the mysterious disappearance of Mrs. Malter headlined the local newspapers. In the excitement a witness told reporters he had seen Mrs. Malter’s handkerchief “or some other article” of hers, near McDowell’s medical school. By noon of 14 September, hundreds of angry locals, led by the German-immigrant population of St. Louis, had gathered outside the Missouri Medical College demanding to search for evidence of Mrs. Malter's murder. McDowell prepared for a violent stand off; he had kept "3 cannons and 1,400 muskets" that had been acquired in his home state of Kentucky in 1846 and intended for political unrest but were unused. Three cannons were sited in the upper room of the school, and the "old flintlock muskets" were gathered to man the defenses with 30 armed students. Fortunately for all concerned, the Police intervened for a peaceful solution. Although McDowell publicly maintained a loudly defiant gung-ho attitude, his students believed he was secretly relieved, having the previous evening gone to the authorities to request protection from an impending public attack. McDowell agreed to Mrs. Malter's husband searching the premises on condition that the mob disperse. No evidence of Mrs. Malters or her alleged murder were found. Two months later Mrs. Malters was found alive and living in Alton Missouri "with a 'handsomer man." Those who found her thought she seemed "mentally unstable"

Infamy further increased after the unusual burial of McDowell's deceased child, Amanda. Although a leading proponent of the importance of science in medicine, McDowell also had strong Spiritual beliefs, fired by a vision of his dead mother, which he believed helped him evade arrest after exhuming a former patient from her grave. Author, and cousin, Mary Ridenbaugh documented his telling of that experience: McDowell believed that traditional burial "stifled the soul" and that a different type of interment would facilitate communication between the living and dead - this was his aim when interring his daughter in a container of preserving alcohol, kept secured in his cave workspace in Hannibal, Missouri. However, when McDowell learned that some locals had been daring each other to break into the cave, and disrespecting his child's remains by opening the copper coffin to scare themselves with ghost stories, he had the body removed for a safer and more traditional burial in the family vault behind the newly built Missouri Medical College. McDowell's unconventional dealing with grief further added to the swirl of lurid rumors around him, including a fable of the body being forcibly removed by angry Hannibal citizens.

== Civil War ==
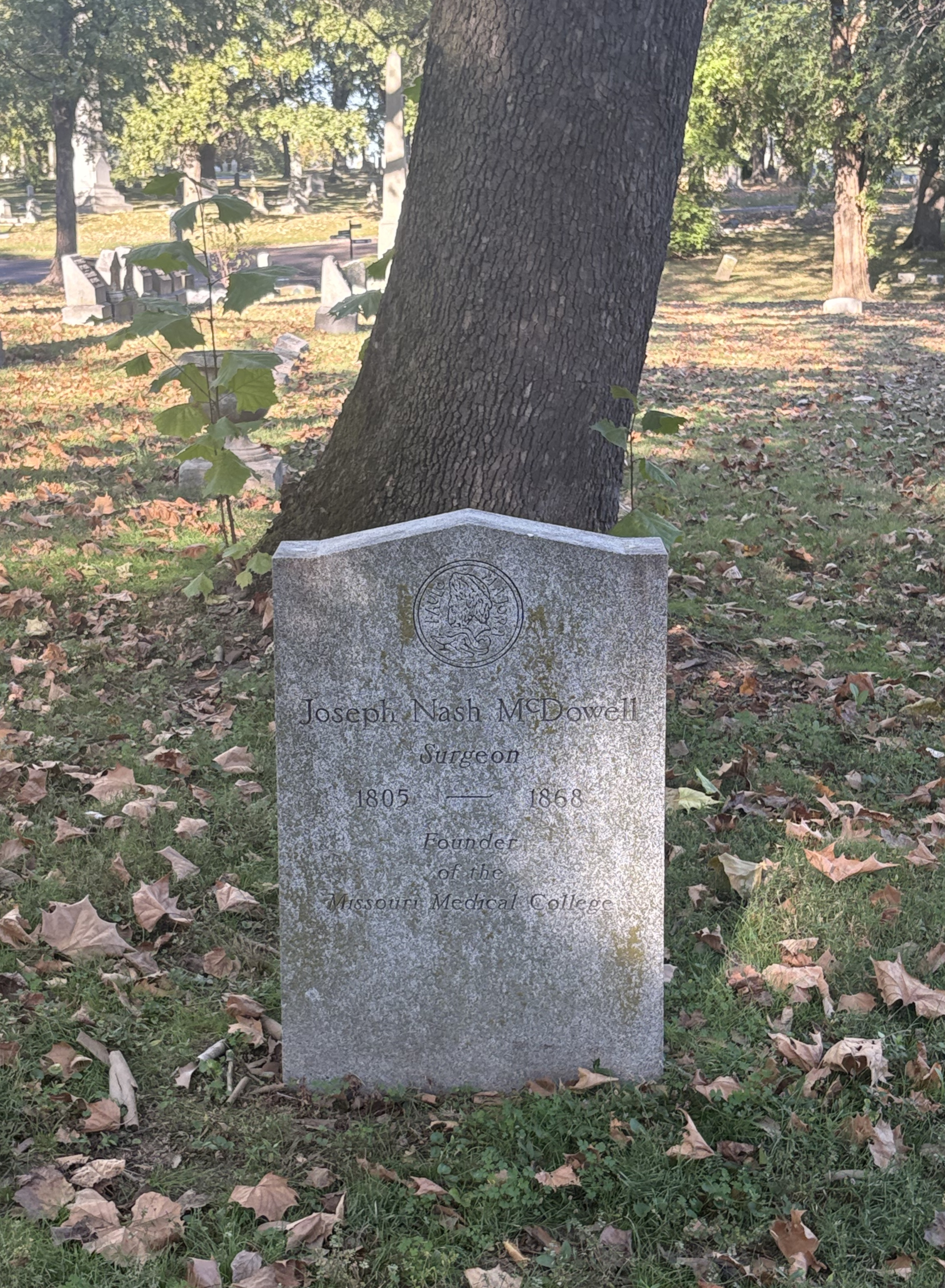
McDowell's grave at Bellefontaine Cemetery

During the onset of the Civil War, McDowell was recruited as the Surgeon General of the Confederate Army of the West. His medical school was taken over by the Union and temporarily became the Gratiot Street Prison. During this time, there were numerous reports of bones being removed from the building, and whispers that it was haunted spread through the public. McDowell returned to St. Louis in 1865 to find the school in ruins. Together with a colleague, he began to rebuild the Medical College. He died three years later, and is buried in the Bellefontaine Cemetery, together with his other family members, in St. Louis.
