= Nancy Cornelius =

American nurse

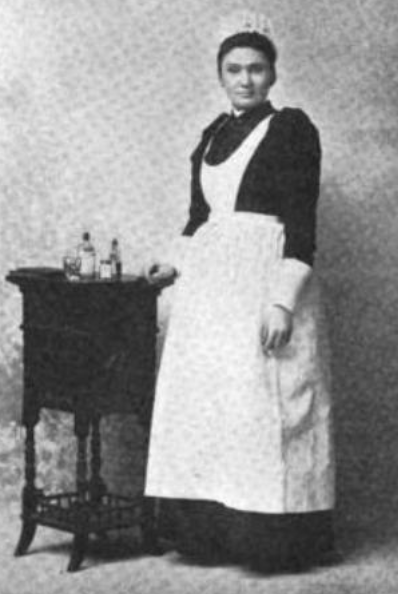
Nancy Cornelius, from a 1918 publication

Nancy Cornelius, later known as Nancy Cornelius Skenadore (13 June 1861 - 2 November 1908), was the first Native American woman in the United States to be educated as a nurse.

== Life and education ==
Nancy was born on an Oneida tribe reservation. The reservation was located south of Green Bay, Wisconsin. She attended school there, and then enrolled in a training school in Carlisle, Pennsylvania. In October in 1890, she graduated from the Hartford Training School for Nurses in Hartford, Connecticut. She married Daniel Skenadore on Easter Sunday in 1901.

== Career ==
After graduating from the Hartford Training School, she worked in Connecticut. Later, she returned to Wisconsin and began to work at the Oneida Mission Hospital. Most of the time there was no resident physician in the hospital, and so Cornelius shouldered much of the responsibility in the hospital. She was superintendent of the hospital until 1905. She practiced as a nurse until her death in 1908.
