= Oneida people =

Indigenous people of the Northeastern Woodlands of North America

Oneida Onʌyoteˀa·ká· or Onʌyotaʼá꞉ka
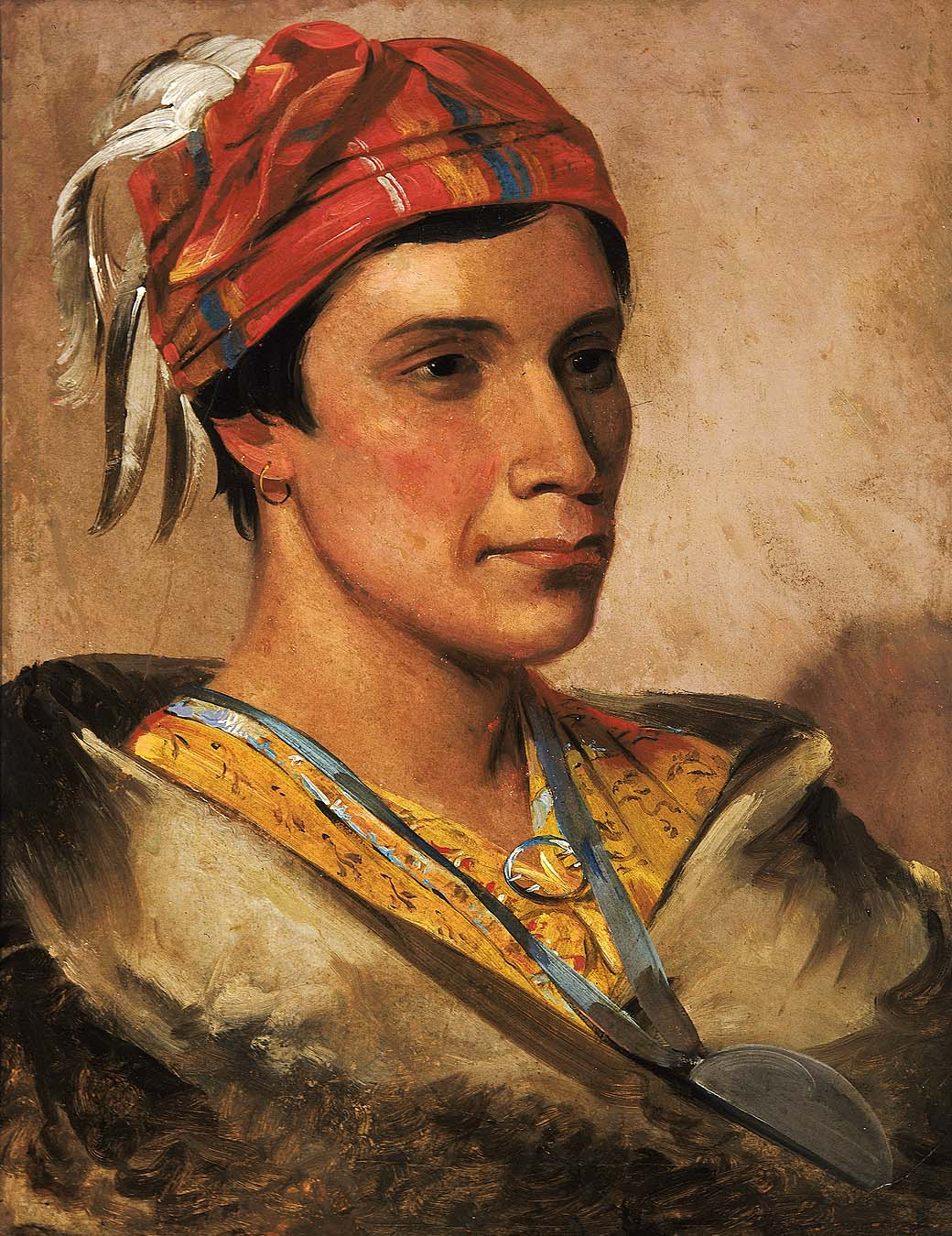
- Daniel Bread or Tekaya-tilu, painted by George Catlin

Total population
- >27,000

Regions with significant populations
- United States (Wisconsin, New York): 17,000 and 1,109
- Canada (Ontario): >9,000

Languages
- Oneida, English, Oneida Sign Language, other Iroquoian languages

Religion
- Haudenosaunee mythology, Christianity, Longhouse religion

Related ethnic groups
- Mohawk people, Onondaga people, Cayuga people, Seneca people, other Iroquoian peoples

The Oneida people (/oʊˈnaɪdə/ oh-NY-də; Oneida: Onʌyoteˀa·ká· IPA: [onə̃jodeʔaːgáː] or Onʌyotaʼá꞉ka IPA: [onə̃jodaʔáːga] (Note: Spelling varies across Oneida sources. Variants include Onʌyotaʼá꞉ka̱, OnΛyota'a:ka, Onʌyoteˀa·ká, Onyota’a:ká:, or Onyota'a꞉ka), lit. 'People of the Standing Stone') are an Indigenous people of the Northeastern Woodlands of North America. They are one of the five founding nations of the Haudenosaunee Confederacy of modern upstate New York and the Great Lakes. They were traditionally located between the Mohawk people to the east and the Onondaga people to the west, particularly the region around Oneida Lake and Oneida County.

The Oneida have two federally recognized tribes in the United States: the Oneida Indian Nation in New York, and the Oneida Nation in and around Green Bay, Wisconsin. In Canada the two Oneida First Nations are both located in Ontario: the Oneida First Nation at the Six Nations of the Grand River, and the Oneida Nation of the Thames in Southwold.

== Etymology ==
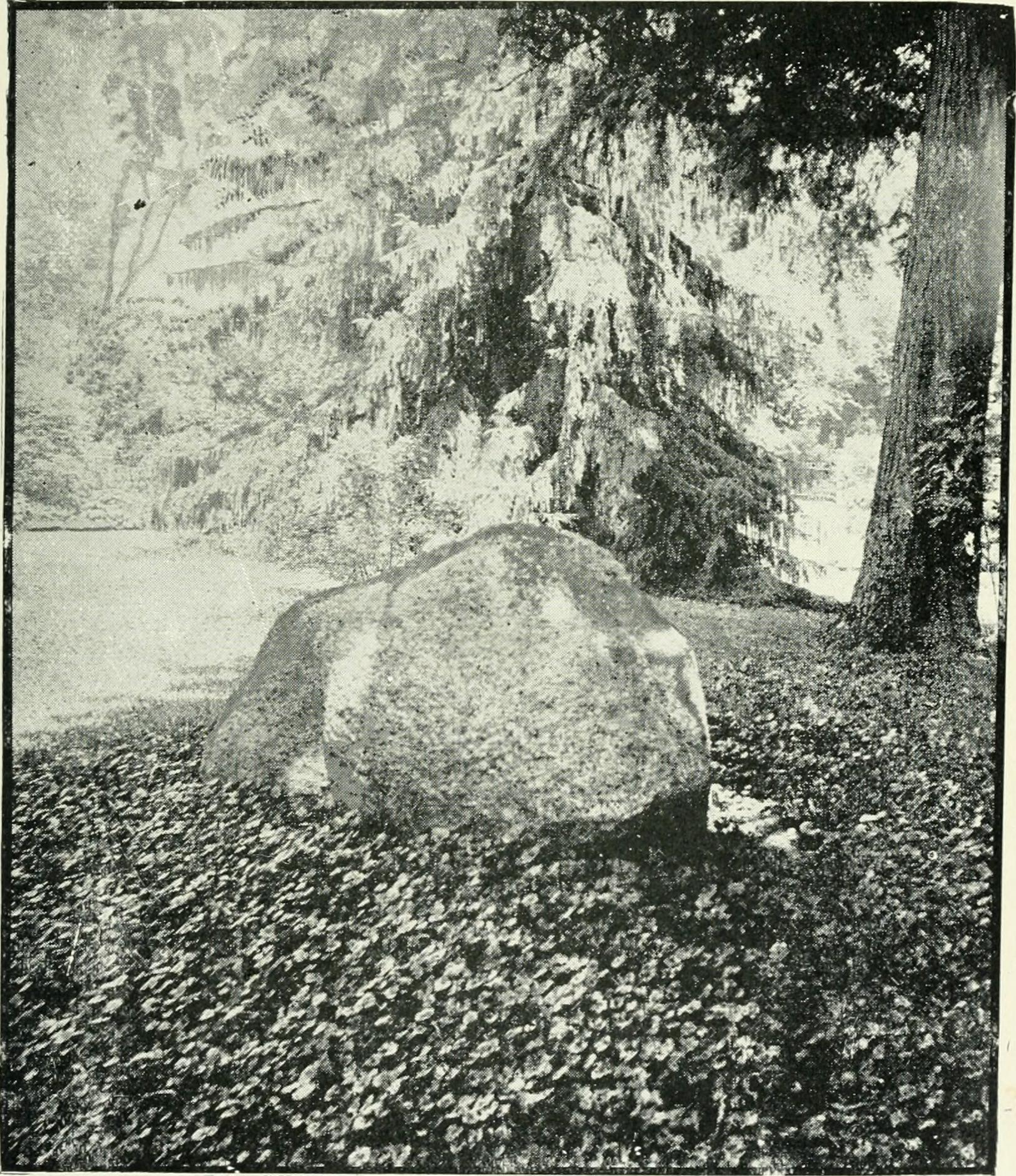
The sacred stone of the Oneidas, at Utica NY, c.1900

The name Oneida is derived from the English pronunciation of Onʌyotaʼá꞉ka, meaning "People of the Standing Stone". This identity is based on an ancient legend. The Oneida people were being pursued on foot by an enemy tribe. As their enemies chased the Oneida into a clearing within the woodlands, they suddenly disappeared. The enemy could not find them, and so it was said that the Oneida had shapeshifted into the stones that stood in the clearing. As a result, they became known as the People of the Standing Stone.

Older legends have the Oneida people identifying as Latilutakówa, the "Big Tree People", "People of big trees". Not much is written about this. Iroquoian elders would have to be consulted on the oral history of this identification. The association may correspond to Haudenosaunee concepts of the Tree of Peace and the associated belief system of the people.

== History ==
=== Homeland boundaries ===
During the early 17th century, the Oneidas occupied and maintained roughly 6 million acres of land in what is modern day central New York State. Formal boundaries were established in the 1768 Treaty of Fort Stanwix, and again, after September 4, 1784, when the governor of New York, George Clinton, requested from the Oneidas the borders of their land, borders were established in the Treaty of Fort Stanwix (1784).

=== American Revolution ===
The Oneida, along with the five other nations of the Haudenosaunee Confederacy, initially maintained a policy of neutrality in the American Revolution. This policy allowed the Confederacy increased leverage against both sides in the war, because they could threaten to join one side or the other in the event of any provocation. Neutrality quickly crumbled, however. The preponderance of the Mohawks, Senecas, Cayugas, and Onondagas sided with the Loyalists and British. For some time, the Oneidas continued advocating neutrality and attempted to restore consensus among the six nations of the Confederacy.

But ultimately the Oneida, as well, had to choose a side. Because of their proximity and relations with the rebel communities, most Oneida favored the revolutionaries. In contrast, some of the pro-British nations were closer to the British stronghold at Fort Niagara. In addition, the Oneida were influenced by the Presbyterian missionary Samuel Kirkland, who had worked among them since 1764. A number of Oneida were baptized as Christians in the decade before the Revolution. Kirkland worked to help them with education and their struggles with alcohol. Through relations with him, many began to form stronger cultural links to the colonists.

The Oneida officially joined the rebel side and contributed in many ways to the war effort. Their warriors were often used to scout on offensive campaigns and to assess enemy operations around Fort Stanwix (also known as Fort Schuyler). The Oneida also provided an open line of communication between the rebels and their Haudenosaunee foes. In 1777 at the Battle of Oriskany, about fifty Oneida fought alongside the colonial militia, this included Tyonajanegen and her husband Han Yerry. Many Oneida formed friendships with Philip Schuyler, George Washington, the Marquis de Lafayette, and other prominent rebel leaders. Polly Cooper was an Oneida woman who traveled to Valley Forge in 1777 during the American Revolution. Under Chief Skenandon's leadership, the Oneidas brought bushels of maize to General George Washington's starving Patriot army. Cooper showed Washington's people how to properly cook and eat the corn. Washington's intentions were to pay cash to Cooper for her generosity, but she refused to accept compensation because she said it was her duty to serve her country. As a token of appreciation, Martha Washington, wife of George Washington, brought Cooper to Philadelphia and bought her a shawl, hat, and bonnet. These men recognized the Oneida contributions during and after the war.

Although leaders of the Oneida had taken the colonists' side, individuals within the decentralized nation could make their own decisions about alliances. A minority, who were already a faction supporting the sachems, supported the British. As the war progressed and the Oneida position became more dire, this minority grew more numerous. When rebel colonists destroyed the important Oneida settlement at Kanonwalohale, numerous Oneida defected from the rebellion and relocated to Fort Niagara to live under British protection.

=== 1794 Treaty of Canandaigua ===
After the war, the Oneida were displaced by retaliatory and other raids by American settlers, who did not always distinguish between Haudenosaunee who had been allies or foes. In 1794 they, along with other Haudenosaunee nations, signed the Treaty of Canandaigua with the United States. They were granted six million acres (24,000 km^{2}) of lands, primarily in New York; this was effectively the first Indian reservation in the United States. Subsequent treaties and actions by the State of New York drastically reduced their land to 32 acres (13 ha).

=== 1838 treaty in Wisconsin ===
Essentially the Oneida had to share land at the Onondaga Reservation and did not have land to call their own. In the 1820s and 1830s many of the Oneida remaining in New York relocated to Wisconsin, where they were allowed to buy land, and to Canada, because the United States was pressing for Indian removals from eastern states. Settlers kept encroaching on them.

In 1838 Daniel Bread (1800–1873) helped negotiate a treaty for the Oneida in Wisconsin by which they asserted their intention to hold their piece of land communally. The amount of land had been reduced by the U.S., as had happened to the Menominee-Stockbridge Indians.

=== Oneida land claims ===
Cornelius Hill succeeded Daniel Bread as Chief after his death in 1873, and for decades fought further relocation of the Oneida, as well as privatization of common lands pursuant to the Dawes Act of 1887, which allowed such after a 25-year trust period. Hill, however, was based in Wisconsin and died in 1907, ostensibly during the trust period which would expire around 1920. After Hill's death, William Rockwell, a conservative, led the Oneida in New York essentially from 1910 to 1960.

Women Oneida activists pushed tribal land claims in the early 20th century. Laura "Minnie" Cornelius Kellogg and her attorney husband (from the Oneida Nation of Wisconsin), and Mary Cornelius Winder and her sister Delia Cornelius Waterman (from the Oneida Indian Nation of New York) were particularly influential from 1920 on in pressing land claims. The women worked from their homes in Prattsburg, New York, and Oneida, Wisconsin. Particularly after the Indian Reorganization Act of 1934, Winder and her sister reached out to the Oneida of Wisconsin, and both American branches of the nation pushed jointly for their land claim. At that point, the remaining Oneida in New York had no land, and were subject to the Onondaga sharing their reservation.

They were encouraged by passage of the Indian Claims Commission Act of 1946, as before that they were unable to bring claims against the US government.

In 1970 and 1974 the Oneida Indian Nation of New York, Oneida Nation of Wisconsin, and the Oneida Nation of the Thames (made up of descendants of people who did not move to Canada until the 1840s) filed suit in the United States District Court for the Northern District of New York to reclaim land taken from them by New York without approval of the United States Congress. In 1998, the United States intervened in the lawsuits on behalf of the plaintiffs in the claim so the claim could proceed against New York State. The state had asserted immunity from suit under the Eleventh Amendment to the United States Constitution. The Defendants moved for summary judgment based on the U. S. Supreme Court's decision in City of Sherrill v. Oneida Indian Nation and the 2nd Circuit U.S. Court of Appeals' decision in Cayuga Indian Nation v. New York

On May 21, 2007, Judge Kahn dismissed the Oneida's possessory land claims and allowed the non-possessory claims to proceed. More recent litigation has formalized the split. It defines the separate interests of the Oneida who stayed in New York and those who relocated to Wisconsin. The Oneida of Wisconsin have brought suit to reacquire lands in their ancestral homelands as part of the settlement of the aforementioned litigation.

== Culture ==
=== Social organization ===
Individuals born into the Oneida are identified according to their spirit name, or what may be called an Indian name, their clan, and their family unit within a clan. The people have a matrilineal kinship system, and children are considered to be born into the mother's clan, through which descent and inheritance passes. Each gender, clan, and family unit within a clan has particular duties and responsibilities in the nation. Clan identities go back to the Creation Story of the Onʌyotaʼa꞉ká꞉ peoples. The people identify with three clans: the Wolf (Othahyu:ní), Turtle (A’no:wál), or Bear (Ohkwa:lí) clans. Each clan has traditional cultural roles, with the Wolf clan representing pathfinders and spiritual guides, the Turtle clan representing knowledge and land keepers, and the Bear clan representing healers. Children take their social status from their mother's clan. Because of this, her eldest brother is a significant figure for the children, especially boys. He supervises the boys' passage into adulthood as men.

The Oneida send nine Rotiyanehson to the Haudenosaunee Grand Council, where they are part of the Younger Brother moiety alongside the Cayuga people.

=== Diet ===
The people made use of the land by "eating the seasons." With a lack of fresh foods in the winter, during the autumn months, the Oneidas dried fruits and vegetables which they had harvested. They also preserved meats in a brine or salt solution, and then hung them to dry. During the fall they would eat deer (oskʌnu·tú), geese (káhuk), duck (taluˀkó), and raccoon (ʌti·lú). Feasting on those meats would store fat which would help them survive during the winter. The Oneidas' diet also consisted of nuts such as hickory nuts (néhkaˀ), black walnuts, butternuts (okehwá·taˀ), and chestnuts. The nuts added protein and fat that were needed to make it through the winter. They also dried wild rice, which grew in swamplands. The wild rice was a source of complex carbohydrates. When spring rolled around, the snow began to melt and the region became warm, the Oneidas' diet would change. They would boil down and eat wild onions, leeks (aˀnukkó), milkweeds, and dandelions. Spring was also when their fishing season began. The fish in their diet consisted of trout (tsyotyá·ktu), bullhead (kaˀnkwilo·kʌ́), walleye (skakahláksʌ), pike, bass, and salmon. Also during the spring months, maple trees provided sap that would be collected, then boiled down to make maple syrup (olutákliˀ) and hard candy. The maple candy would be used for consumption in this form or saved for later to flavor foods. During the summer months the Oneidas would consume various fruits such as strawberries (awʌhíhte), blackberries, raspberries (sá·yes), blueberries (otstókwi), pears, plums (wíhsuˀ), peaches (yonuhwé·lhoteˀ kahik), apples (swahyo·wáneˀ), and grapes (oˀnʌhalhkó). The Oneidas also used sassafras for tea.

=== Dances ===
There are two types of Oneida dancing: social and ceremonial. Social dancing is for the enjoyment of all people. The Round Dance, Rabbit Dance, Old Moccasin Dance and Canoe or Fishing Dance are different types of social dances. Ceremonial dancing is sacred and is not to be performed in public. Sacred dances are meant to be performed privately in the longhouses. The Maple Syrup (Otsyiˀkhé·ta Twanehela·tú), Strawberry (Twahyahnekílha), Bean (Oyhóhtseh), Sun (Shukwahtsía Tʌyethinuhwela·tú·), and Moon (Thuwi·sáhs) ceremonies each have different types of ceremonial dances. Singing is a part of ceremonial dancing; however, they only chant during social dances. There is an introduction for every song. When the beat changes, the dancing begins. Cues are given from the drums, which indicate to the dancers when to switch partners. If a dancer was invited to dance, but refused, etiquette required them to offer tobacco as a settlement.

=== Traditional clothing ===
Before coming into contact with the Europeans, the Oneida used natural materials to make their clothing, including deer and other animal hides. Following the arrival of European traders, clothing began to be made from calico cotton (otsistóhkwaˀ) and broadcloth and has remained predominantly cotton ever since. The Oneidas typically wore moccasins (ahtaˀu·wé) on their feet. While the material has changed, the basic design of the outfits remains generally the same hundreds of years later.

Oneida men and women traditionally wear different headwear. Men wear traditional Haudenosaunee headdresses called kastoweh (kastówe) which consist of feathers and insignia representing their nation. The insignia for the Oneida consists of three eagle feathers; two standing straight up and one falling downwards. Oneida women wear beaded tiaras sewn with woodland designs.

== Recognized Oneida nations ==
- Oneida Indian Nation in New York
- Oneida Nation of Wisconsin, in and around Green Bay, Wisconsin
- Oneida Nation of the Thames in Southwold, Ontario
- Oneida at Six Nations of the Grand River, Ontario
  - Oneida First Nation

== Education ==
Oneida Nation School System in Wisconsin is a K–12 tribal school.

== Historical Oneida people ==
Contemporary Oneida people should be listed on their nation's articles.

- Daniel Bread (1800–1873), principal chief of the Oneida, migrated to Wisconsin
- Polly Cooper, leader, took white corn to General Washington and troops in 1777–78 during the Revolution in winter quarters at Valley Forge and taught them how to cook it
- Skenandoa (aka Skenando, Shenandoah) (c. 1706–1816), Pine Tree Chief and leader during the American Revolution; ally of the Americans
- Tyonajanegen, leader, fought in Battle of Oriskany alongside husband Han Yerry

== Literature ==
- Glatthaar, Joseph T. and James Kirby Martin. Forgotten Allies: The Oneida Indians and the American Revolution. London: Macmillan, 2007.
- Levinson, David. "An Explanation for the Oneida-Colonist Alliance in the American Revolution," Ethnohistory 23, no. 3. (Summer, 1976), pp. 265–289. JSTOR 481255
- Koch, Daniel. Land of the Oneidas: Central New York State and the Creation of America, From Prehistory to the Present. Albany: State University of New York Press, 2023.
