= San Juan Pueblo =

San Juan Pueblo may refer to

- San Juan Pueblo (Honduras), village near La Ceiba, Honduras
- San Juan Pueblo, New Mexico, former name of Ohkay Owingeh, a pueblo in New Mexico, until it changed name in 2005
- San Juan Pueblo Airport, former name of Ohkay Owingeh Airport, until its name change in 2008
