= Ruth Muskrat Bronson =

American Cherokee poet, educator and activist (1897–1982)

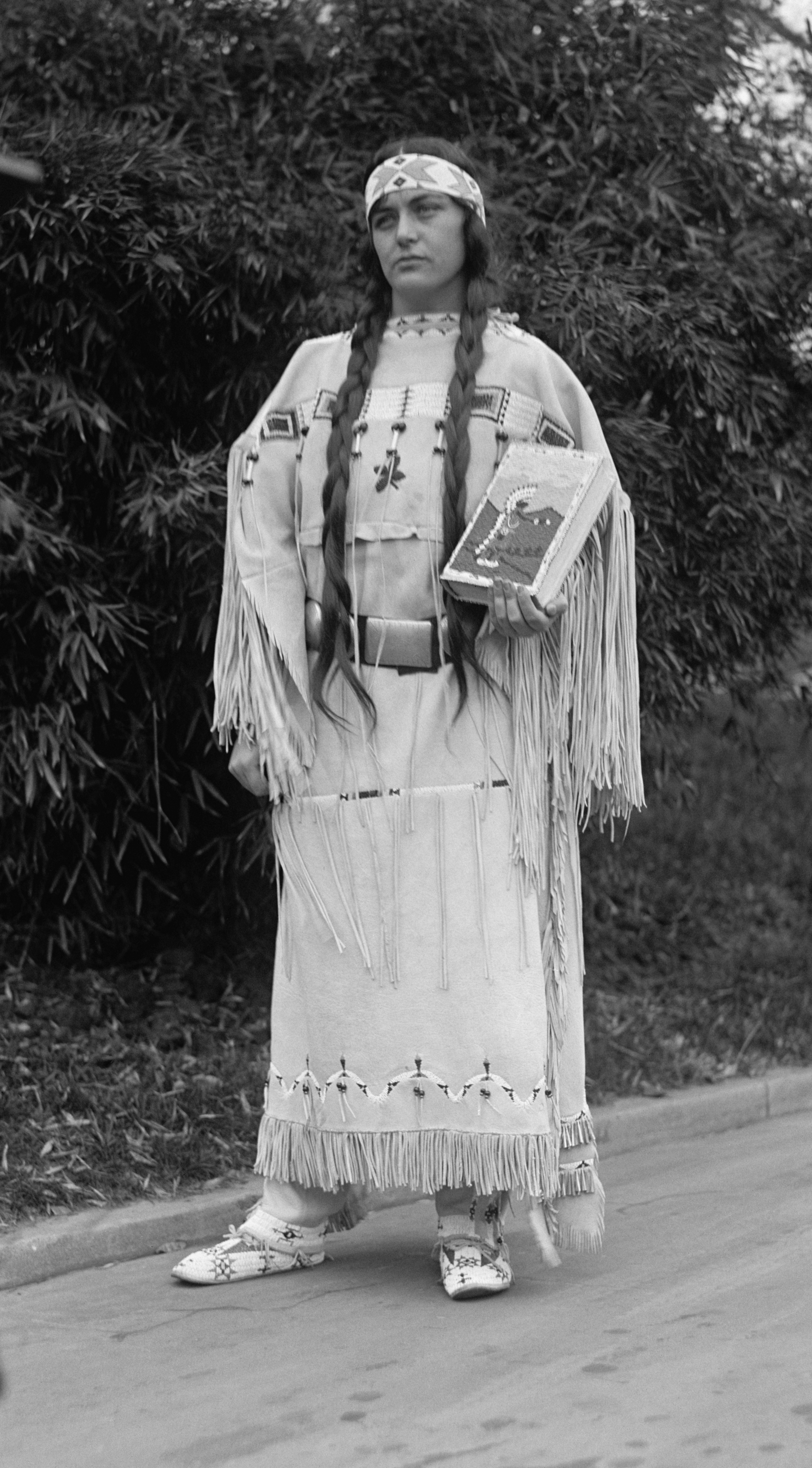
- Ruth Muskrat, holding The Red Man In The United States, (1919), by Gustavus Elmer Emmanuel Lindquist December 13, 1923
- Born: Ruth Margaret Muskrat; October 3, 1897; White Water, Delaware Nation Reservation, Indian Territory
- Died: June 12, 1982 (aged 84); Tucson, Arizona
- Occupations: Poet; educator; Indian rights activist
- Years active: 1925–82
- Known for: first Guidance and Placement Officer of the Bureau of Indian Affairs

Ruth Muskrat Bronson (October 3, 1897 – June 12, 1982) was a Cherokee Nation poet, educator and Indian rights activist. After completing her education, Bronson became the first Guidance and Placement Officer of the Bureau of Indian Affairs. She served as executive secretary for the National Congress of American Indians, which was founded in 1944, and created their legislative news service.

After a decade of work in Washington, D.C., Bronson moved to Arizona. There she served as a health education specialist for the Indian Health Service. Upon her retirement from the government, she received the Oveta Culp Hobby Service Award from the Department of Health, Education and Welfare. She continued working for Native American rights, promoting their development and leadership in the private sector until her death.

== Early life ==
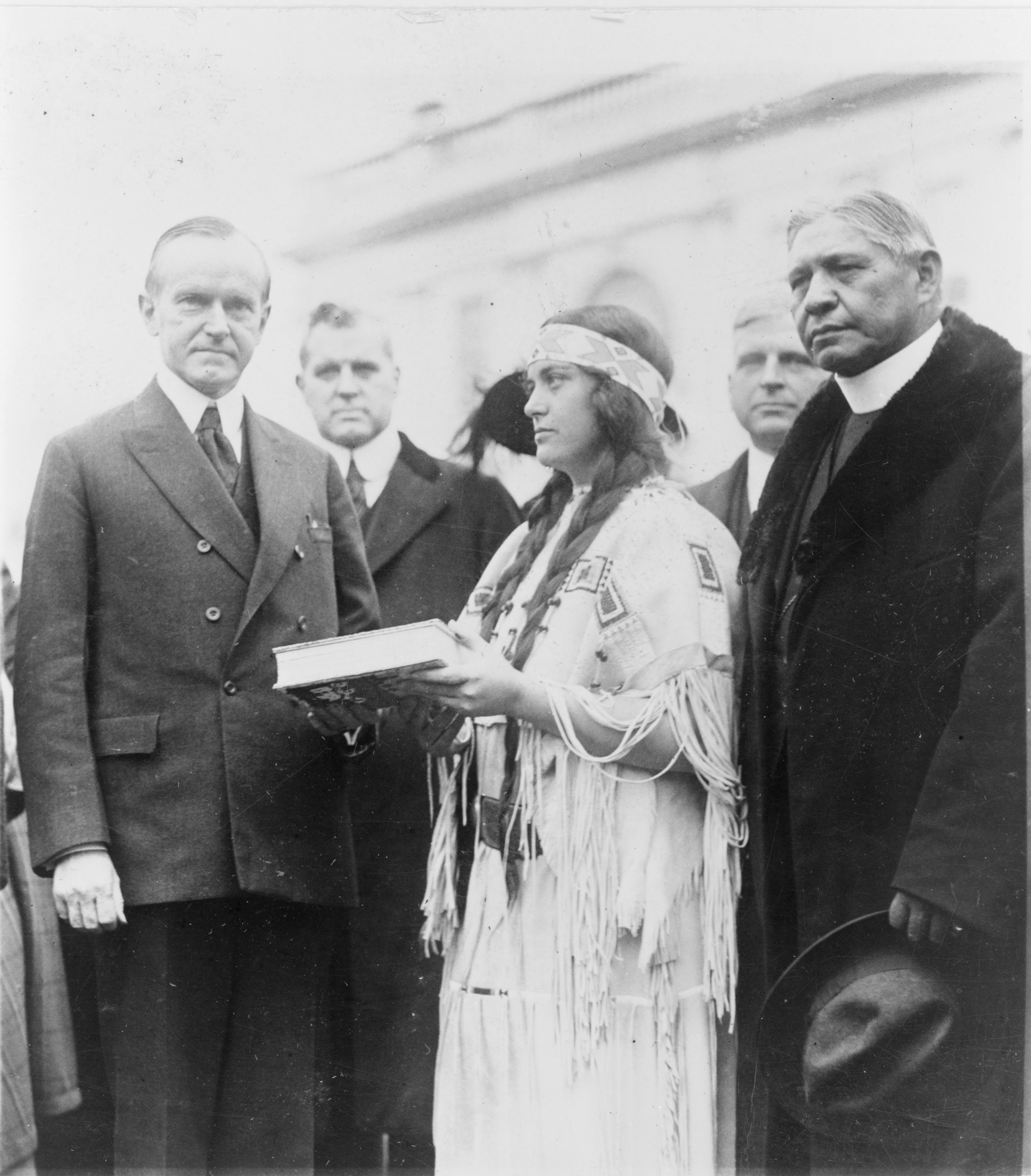
On behalf of "The Committee of One Hundred", Ruth Muskrat Bronson presents Gustavus Elmer Emmanuel Lindquist′s book The Red Man In The United States (1919) to President Calvin Coolidge; on the right is Rev. Sherman Coolidge, co-founder of the Society of American Indians, December 13, 1923.

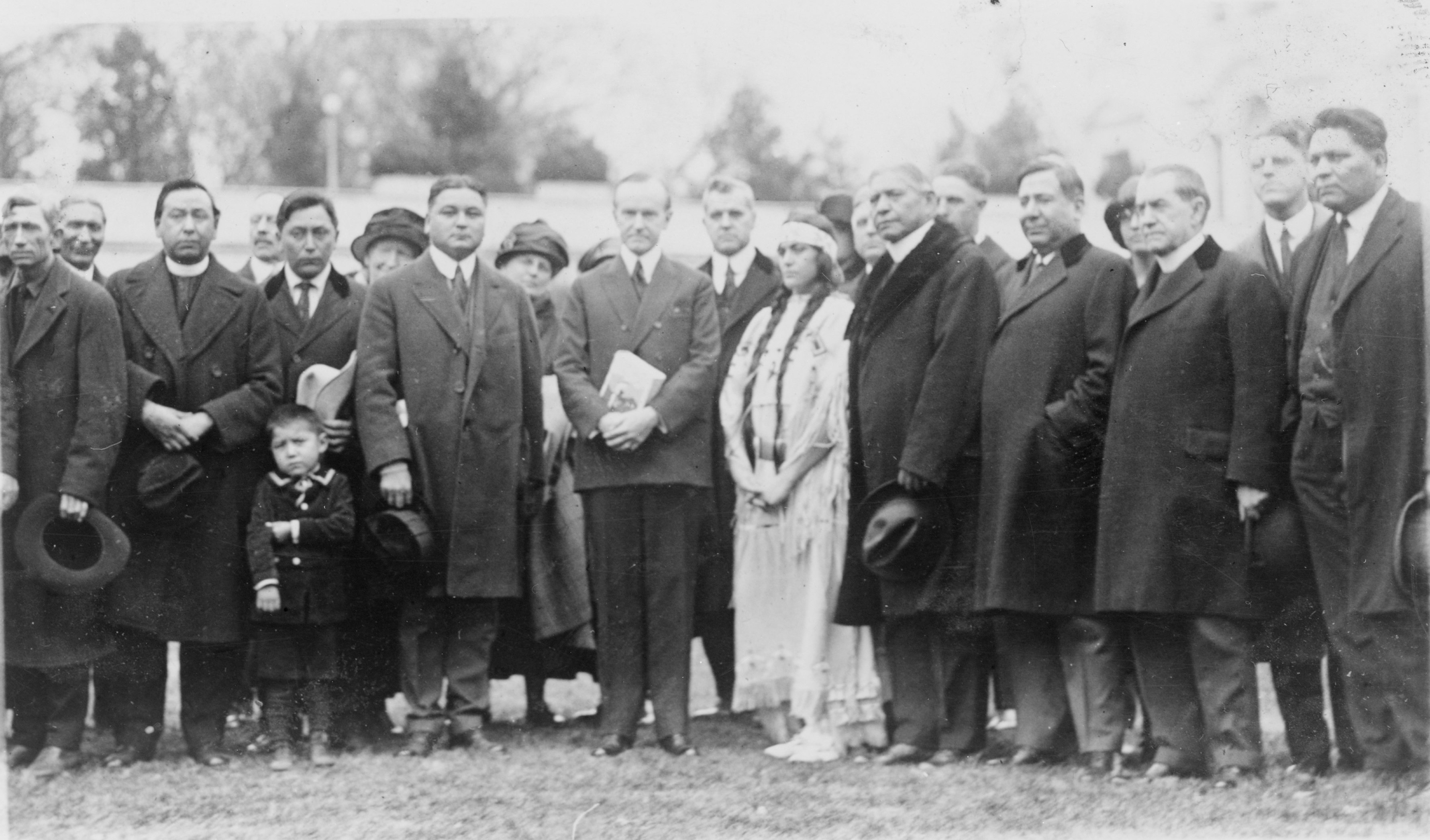
Committee of 100 on Indian Affaires, with President Calvin Coolidge, Ruth Muskrat, and Rev. Sherman Coolidge

Ruth Margaret Muskrat was born on October 3, 1897 in White Water, on the Delaware Nation Reservation in Indian Territory to Ida Lenora (née Kelly), an Irish-English transplant from Missouri, and James Ezekial Muskrat, a Cherokee. Her ancestors (through her father) had traveled the Trail of Tears from Georgia to Indian Territory in the late 1830s during Indian Removal. When she was ten years old, she witnessed the disruption caused to the lives of her nation when the Curtis Act of 1898, an amendment of the Dawes Act, applied allotment of communal lands to the Five Civilized Tribes.

== Early education ==
At the age of fourteen, Muskrat enrolled in preparatory school at the Oklahoma Institute of Technology in Tonkawa, graduating in 1916. She furthered her education at Henry Kendall College in Tulsa and at Northeastern State Teachers College. Financial hardship forced her to stop classes, and she taught for two years to earn sufficient funds to continue her schooling.

In 1919, Muskrat enrolled at the University of Oklahoma, where she studied for three semesters. During the summer of 1921, she worked for the YWCA and was sent to work on the Mescalero Apache Reservation in New Mexico. Her report on her organizing efforts earned her a scholarship to attend the University of Kansas, where she studied for three more semesters.

== Committee of One Hundred ==
In 1922, Muskrat went to Peking, China for an international youth conference as part of a YWCA delegation. She was one of the first Native American women to serve as a student delegate abroad. The trip, which included stops in "Hawaii, Manchuria, Japan, Korea and Hong Kong." brought Muskrat to the attention of the international press. She was inspired to work for racial equality.

The following year, Muskrat delivered an appeal to the United States President Coolidge for better educational facilities for Native Americans. She made the presentation at a gathering of Native American leaders, which was known as the "Committee of One Hundred", to advise President Coolidge on American Indian policy. Muskrat advocated that Indians be involved in solving their own problems. Moved by her speech, President Calvin Coolidge and his wife, Grace, invited Muskrat to lunch with them.

== Later education ==
In 1923, she enrolled as a junior in Mount Holyoke College, with a full scholarship, and in 1925 graduated with a BA in English. During her college days, Muskrat was a prolific poet, influenced by the Modernist movement.

== Career ==
After graduation, Muskrat began working at the Haskell Institute as an eighth grade teacher, and then as head of the college placement bureau. Muskrat was well loved among her students because of her sense of humor and her commitment to sharing the Native American culture to her students. Ruth Muskrat would constantly remind her students to have pride in their heritage with her phrase "Indians are people too, don't forget that." She won the Henry Morgenthau Prize in 1926 for best use of her college education in the first year graduation. Throughout the 1920's, Bronson advocated for an education for Native Americans that was not assimilationist, but for one that would allow for "preservation of 'what was best' in Native cultures." "The Serpent" is a short story written by Bronson in 1925 which "challenges federal policy during the allotment period."

In 1928, Muskrat married John F. Bronson and they adopted a native girl.

In 1931, the Bureau of Indian Affairs (BIA) created a new program to improve educational opportunities for Native Americans. Bronson was appointed as the first Guidance and Placement Officer of the bureau and tasked with helping graduates find viable employment. In 1937, she was awarded the Indian Achievement Medal of the Indian Council Fire, the second woman to have received the award since its inception. She had previously been nominated for the award in its inaugural year in 1933. Bronson was in charge of distributing government loans and scholarships for students, as well as helping them find jobs. She worked at the BIA until 1943.

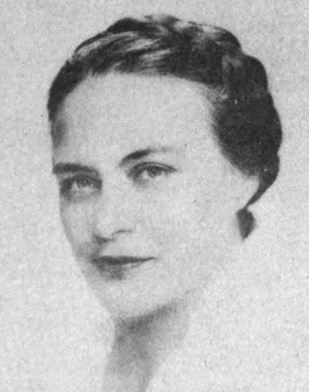
Ruth Muskrat Bronson, 1947

Bronson spent a few years out of the workforce raising her daughter. During this period, she wrote and published several books and articles, including Indians are People Too (1944), The Church in Indian Life(1945), and Shall We Repeat Indian History in Alaska? (1947).

In 1945, Bronson began working with the recently established National Congress of American Indians (NCAI) and soon emerged as a leader. She was appointed as the executive secretary of the organization and spent a decade monitoring legislative issues. She also established the NCAI's legislative news service. During this period, she spoke at numerous tribal meetings throughout the country, promoting Native American progress. Bronson advocated such issues as native water rights along the Colorado River, native rights in the Territory of Alaska, and gaining quality medical care for American Indians. After ten years of serving as executive secretary, in 1955 Bronson was elected as treasurer of the NCAI. Tired of the contentiousness of national politics, she focused on ways to work directly with local communities.

In 1957, Bronson moved to Arizona, where she served as a health education specialist at the San Carlos Apache Indian Reservation for the Indian Health Service (part of the Department of Health and Human Services). During the same period, she served as a vice president of the philanthropic ARROW Organization. She managed the education loan and scholarship fund of the organization, as well as advising tribes on community development. In 1962, Bronson was awarded the Oveta Culp Hobby Service Award from the Department of Health, Education and Welfare for her work serving Native Americans and retired from government service.

She moved to Tucson. In 1963, Bronson became the national program chairman of the Community Development Foundation's American Indian section. The organization operated under the umbrella of the Save the Children Federation. After a stroke in 1972, Bronson slowed, but did not stop her activism for Native Americans. She advocated their determining their own development and leadership programs. In 1978, Bronson was among recipients of the National Indian Child Conference's merit award for commitment to improving children's quality of life.

Bronson also revolutionized gender norms in the Cherokee Nation, as she followed the ways of male leaders by dressing in what looked good to her and what would get her into places that she wanted to go.

Bronson died on June 12, 1982, in Tucson, Arizona and was interred at Riverside Cemetery in Waterbury, Connecticut.
