= Joe A. Garcia =

Native American leader (died 2023)

- Sokuwa Owing Taa'

Governor, Ohkay Owingeh
- In office: 1995–1996; 1996–1997; 2005–2006

President, National Congress of American Indians
- In office 2005–2009

Chairman, All Indian Pueblo Council
- In office 2007–2010

Head Councilman, Ohkay Owingeh
- In office 2009–2023

Joe A. Garcia (c. 1952 – May 11, 2023), also known as Sokuwa Owing Taa', was a Native American leader from the US state of New Mexico. A former governor of the Ohkay Owingeh pueblo, he served as president of the National Congress of American Indians (NCAI) for two terms, from 2005 to 2009. He also served as chairman of the All Indian Pueblo Council. From 2009 onward, he was head councilman of the Ohkay Owingeh, formerly known as the San Juan Pueblo. An electrical engineer by profession, Garcia worked at Los Alamos National Laboratory for 25 years, retiring in 2003. He was also a singer-guitarist for the country music band Jed, and performed in the first Native Roots & Rhythms Festival in New Mexico in 1995.

== Early life and education ==
Garcia was born and raised in Ohkay Owingeh, New Mexico, US. His name in Tewa, Sokuwa Owing Taa', means "mark of the misty lake". He grew up speaking Tewa at home and started learning English in first grade, attending a school funded by the Bureau of Indian Affairs for the first six years. He transferred to public school, where he played football and ran track. In high school in Española, he started playing the guitar and singing.

Garcia first started working at Los Alamos National Laboratory while studying electronics at Haskell Indian Junior College. He then joined the United States Air Force for four years, leaving the service with veterans' benefits which allowed him to pursue an engineering degree. He earned a Bachelor of Science degree in electrical engineering from the University of New Mexico.

== Professional career ==
After graduating, Garcia returned to Los Alamos National Laboratory (LANL), where he worked for a total of 25 years. An electrical engineer and manager, he worked in weapons research, quality improvement, and as a tribal relations team leader, responsible for liaising with the four pueblos sharing boundaries with LANL. From 1979 to 1983, he also taught courses at Northern New Mexico College in subjects including computers, electronics, and lasers, as well as mathematics.

In 2003, Garcia retired from LANL to spend more time on tribal community affairs, and founded MistyLake Consulting Services, his own business focused on strategic planning and quality improvement.

== Career in tribal government and advocacy ==
=== Ohkay Owingeh (San Juan Pueblo) ===
In 1991, Garcia was appointed lieutenant governor of the San Juan Pueblo, and was re-appointed in 1993. He was appointed governor in 1995 and 1997, and again in 2005, after being chosen by the council, which includes religious leaders, former governors, and other appointees.

During his first two terms, Garcia led an initiative to transfer control of the local elementary school to San Juan Pueblo. In addition, he helped establish a pueblo housing authority and promoted expansion of the Tsay Corporation, a federally chartered Section 17 corporation owned by the tribe.

In September 2005, pueblo members voted to change its name back to Ohkay Owingeh. According to the tribe at the time, it was over 800 years old and had more than 6,800 members. Garcia served his third and final term as governor of the Ohkay Owingeh from 2005 to 2006.

In 2009, Garcia became head councilman of the pueblo, a lifetime position. In 2013, he received the New Mexico Distinguished Public Service Award for a second time, in recognition of his work to ensure that the Tewa language was incorporated into the school curriculum at the Head Start, elementary, and high school levels in his and other pueblos.

=== National Congress of American Indians ===
Garcia first became involved in the National Congress of American Indians (NCAI) in 1995, after attending their annual meeting in San Diego, where he was elected Southwest vice president. He went on to serve in a variety of roles, including two terms as first vice president. In November 2005, Garcia was elected president of the NCAI, the highest elected position in Indian country, with 60 percent of the vote in a three-way race. He was the second pueblo leader from New Mexico to hold the office since the NCAI was founded in 1944, after John Gonzales of San Ildefonso Pueblo. Based in Washington, D.C., the role at the watchdog organization required him to work with more than 250 Native American groups while monitoring federal legislation. Reelected in 2007, he went on to serve the maximum two terms as president through October 2009.

As president of the NCAI, Garcia advocated increased participation of the American Indian and Alaskan Native communities in the 2008 United States elections as a means of protecting Native sovereignty at all levels of government. He also led the "Indian Country Counts" 2010 Census campaign pushing for a more accurate count of the Native American population to improve federal funding. He continued to be involved with NCAI after serving as president, and was serving as Southwest regional vice president until he died.

=== All Indian Pueblo Council ===
Following his term as governor of the Ohkay Owingeh, Garcia was elected chairman of the All Indian Pueblo Council (AIPC), representing 19 pueblos in New Mexico, and served from 2007 to 2010. The AIPC later dissolved as a nonprofit organization and reemerged as the All Pueblo Council of Governors in 2013.

=== Task forces and committees ===
Garcia served as co-chair of several national task forces and committees, including the Tribal Leaders Task Force for the FCC (Federal Communications Commission); the Tribal Technical Advisory Committee for SAMHSA (Substance Abuse and Mental Health Services Administration); and the Tribal Transportation Self Governance Program.

== Honors and recognition ==
New Mexico Governor Bill Richardson proclaimed February 7, 2006, as "Governor Joe Garcia Day", honoring him in a ceremony at the New Mexico State Capitol. On January 1, 2007, Garcia administered the oath of office to Richardson at his second inauguration as state governor. It was the first time in state history that the governor of a pueblo had sworn in a governor of New Mexico.

Garcia received numerous other awards including:

- 1995 New Mexico Distinguished Public Service Award
- 1998 New Mexico Community Foundation Luminaries Award
- 2013 New Mexico Distinguished Public Service Award
- 2018 American Indian Science and Engineering Society (AISES) Ely S. Parker Lifetime Achievement Award

== Personal life ==
Garcia and his wife Oneva had three children, including a son who predeceased him in 2020. Oneva, who is originally from North Carolina, is a member of the Eastern Band of Cherokees, as are their children.

While in college, Garcia belonged to an all-Native rock band called The Hunted Race, which performed across the Midwest and Southwest. In the 1980s, he was the lead vocalist and played guitar and bass for JED, a Native American country rock band which he formed with his cousin Eddie Martinez.

Garcia died on May 11, 2023, at the age of 70. He was survived by his wife, two daughters, six grandchildren, and two great-grandchildren.
