= Helen Peterson =

Native American rights administrator (1915–2000)

- Born: Helen Louise White; August 3, 1915; Pine Ridge Indian Reservation, near Pine Ridge, South Dakota
- Died: July 10, 2000 (aged 84); Vancouver, Washington
- Other names: Helen L. Peterson, Helen Louise White Peterson, Helen White Peterson,
- Occupation: Native American activist
- Known for: one of the first women lobbyists advocating for Civil Rights of American Indians

Helen Peterson (native name: Wa-Cinn-Ya-Win-Pi-Mi, August 3, 1915 – July 10, 2000) was a Cheyenne-Lakota activist and lobbyist. She was the first director of the Denver Commission on Human Relations. She was the second Native American woman to become director of the National Congress of American Indians at a time when the government wanted to discharge their treaty obligations to the tribes by eliminating their tribal governments through the Indian termination policy and forcing the tribe members to assimilate into the mainstream culture. She authored a resolution on Native American education, which was ratified at the second Inter-American Indian Conference, held in Cuzco, Peru. In 1986, Peterson was inducted into the Colorado Women's Hall of Fame and the following year, her papers were donated to the Smithsonian's National Anthropological Archives and they are now held at the National Museum of the American Indian.

== Early life ==
Helen Louise White was born on August 3, 1915, on the Pine Ridge Indian Reservation in Bennett County, South Dakota to Lucy (née Henderson) and Robert B. White. She was given the native name Wa-Cinn-Ya-Win-Pi-Mi, meaning "woman to trust and depend on". The family lived in northern Nebraska and White attended Hay Springs High School, graduating in 1932. She went on to further her education at Chadron State College, studying business education. On August 29, 1935, White married Richard F. Peterson in Garden County, Nebraska and she worked at the U.S. Land Use Resettlement Administration to pay their way through school. Richard enlisted in the war effort and Peterson had their only child, R. Max, soon after. In 1942, the couple divorced and Peterson moved with her mother to Denver.

== Career ==
Peterson began work at the University of Denver as the executive director of the Rocky Mountain Council of Inter-American Affairs. In 1948, she was hired by the newly elected mayor, J. Quigg Newton, to work on the Commission on Community Telations. The mayor had a goal of desegregating the community and to do that, he needed voters willing to change the municipal charter. Working with Bernie Valdez, Director of the Denver Welfare Department, Peterson attempted to build bridges between the established Latin American citizens and the new migrant farm workers who had come to work on the beetroot farms. She went door to door in Hispanic neighborhoods, registering voters and organizing the community. Peterson developed cultural programs and met with city leaders to provide lecture series on issues, such as fair labor and housing laws. At the end of the year, she was made the director of the Committee on Human Relations, the first person to hold the post. In that capacity, she led a drive to hire minority workers and assisted the mayor in passing anti-discriminatory employment and housing regulations. In 1949, she was asked to go to Peru as an advisor to the United States delegation attending the Second Inter-American Indian Conference. She authored a resolution to improve education for indigenous people, which was ratified by the conference.

In 1953, Peterson was urged by Eleanor Roosevelt to move to Washington, D.C., and help reorganize the National Congress of American Indians (NCAI). The organization, founded in 1944 to fight against the government's Indian termination policy was in disarray, on the verge of bankruptcy, and was facing pressure from President Dwight D. Eisenhower for its dissolution. Because of Peterson's experience in organizing minority programs, she was able to slow the assimilationist aims of Congress and assist tribes in asserting their own sovereign rights. Peterson was hired to replace Frank George, who had in turn replaced Ruth Muskrat Bronson as executive director.

Early in 1954, Peterson scheduled an emergency conference with tribal leaders to discuss termination. The meeting was the largest gathering of protest that had ever been assembled by American Indians, and was scheduled in response to the passage of House concurrent resolution 108, which called for the end of federal responsibility for selected tribes, which were to be debated beginning on February 15, 1954. She and her mother prepared the materials for the conference on a hand cranked mimeograph machine in her basement. Another bill was introduced that year to eliminate competency restrictions on land transactions and required Peterson to mobilize tribal leaders to wire their congressmen to defeat the bill. At issue was whether property patents would be assigned by allotment directly to tribal members who had no real knowledge of property values or laws governing transfer, or whether the deeds to allotted property were held in trust until allottees actually had an understanding of property ownership and fair market value. Her efforts in advancing Native Americans and fighting against discriminatory legislation was recognized by the American Indian Exposition of Anadarko, Oklahoma, which named her the "Outstanding Indian of 1955".

As NCAI made progress in slowing termination, Peterson helped develop new tactics to protect Native rights, such as creating a summer school program with D'Arcy McNickle in 1956 for ethnic studies and convincing NBC to air a program on the policy and its effect on the Klamath Tribes in 1957. In 1958, Peterson and NCAI president Joseph R. Garry went to Puerto Rico to study the methods of Operation Bootstrap, which had transformed the economic relationship between the island and the United States government. They were hopeful that the program could be mirrored for Native Americans to become self-sufficient, but legislators refused to act. In 1960, at the invitation of Sol Tax, an anthropologist, Peterson met with McNickle and John Rainer to prepare materials for a conference to be held in Chicago the following year. Largely drafted by McNickle the, "Declaration of Indian Purpose" for the 1961 American Indian Chicago Conference contained provisions for a reversal of the termination policy to be replaced by programs focused on development of economic, educational, social and legal nature. The declaration also called for the Commissioner of Indian Affairs to be replaced by a Commission of six members, half of whom were Native American, to evaluate issues effecting tribes. As the conference date neared in June 1961, factions emerged. Some felt that the organized NCAI operated more in the manner of a non-Indian reform association, rather than one that used traditional methods to address problems, whereas others felt that its focus did not adequately represent the issues of tribal identity and reservation realities. By August, the factionalism which had become apparent in planning the convention, created calls for restructuring the NCAI and Peterson resigned.

Returning to Denver in 1962, Peterson again took up the post as the director of the Commission on Community Relations. The Indian Relocation Act of 1956 caused a large influx of Native Americans to the Denver area, but Congress had failed to sufficiently fund the program. Peterson's office tried to fill the gap by providing social and employment services, as well as job training for Denver's Native American community. Though no longer employed at the NCAI, controversy continued and her replacement, Robert Burnette, accused both Peterson and Garry of mismanagement during their tenure. The dispute between Burnette and his supporters and Peterson and hers, continued through the 1960s dividing the NCAI membership. Burnette was forced out in 1964 and replaced by Vine Deloria Jr., who had the difficult task of trying to bring the organization back to financial stability and heal the factionalism. After eight years, of directing the commission, Peterson accepted a position with the Bureau of Indian Affairs (BIA), working as a field liaison officer and coordinator with the United States Customs Service in Denver. In 1971, she returned to Washington, D.C., and served as the assistant for the Commissioner of Indian Affairs. In 1978, the BIA transferred her to serve as a tribal government services officer in Portland, Oregon. Focusing on treaty obligations and Indian health, she worked to ensure that federal, state, local and tribal governments worked together in serving the American Indian community. She remained with the BIA until her retirement in 1985.

The year after her retirement, Peterson was inducted into the Colorado Women's Hall of Fame. The following year, her papers were donated to the National Anthropological Archives of the Smithsonian Institution. When the National Museum of the American Indian Archive Center was created in 2007, her papers were transferred there. Upon her retirement, Peterson devoted her time to local and regional projects in and around Portland for the Episcopal Church. She remained an active member in the NCAI through the early 1990s, participating in the 1993 Albuquerque conference held at the University of New Mexico on developing inter-tribal relationships.

== Death and legacy ==
Peterson died on July 10, 2000, in a nursing home in Vancouver, Washington. Peterson is credited with having led NCAI to stop, or at least slow, the termination movement while she served as director of NCAI. The ethnic studies program that she and McNickle developed for Colorado College between 1956 and 1970 became a model for universities throughout the United States.
