= National Congress of American Indians =

American Indigenous rights organization

- Abbreviation: NCAI
- Formation: November 17, 1944; 81 years ago
- Registration no.: EIN 53-0210846
- Purpose: Public affairs, ethnic and racial minority rights, religious and cultural awareness
- Headquarters: Embassy of Tribal Nations
- Location: Washington, D.C., U.S.
- President: Mark Macarro (Pechanga)
- First Vice President: Brian Weeden (Mashpee Wampanoag)
- Secretary: Nickolaus D. Lewis (Lummi)
- Treasurer: David Woerz (Chickasaw)
- Website: ncai.org

The National Congress of American Indians (NCAI) is an American Indigenous rights organization. It was founded in 1944 to represent the tribes and resist U.S. federal government pressure for termination of tribal rights and forced assimilation of Native Americans (including Alaska Natives). These were in contradiction of their treaty rights and status as sovereign entities. The organization continues to be an association of federally recognized and state-recognized American Indian and Alaska Native tribes.

== Organization ==
NCAI was founded in 1944 and incorporated as a 501(c)(4) nonprofit organization based in Washington, D.C., in 1962. The organizational structure of the National Congress of American Indians includes a General Assembly, an Executive Council, and seven committees.

In addition to the four executive positions, the NCAI executive board also consists of 12 area vice presidents and 12 alternative area vice presidents.

Chuck Trimble was the former chief executive.

== History ==
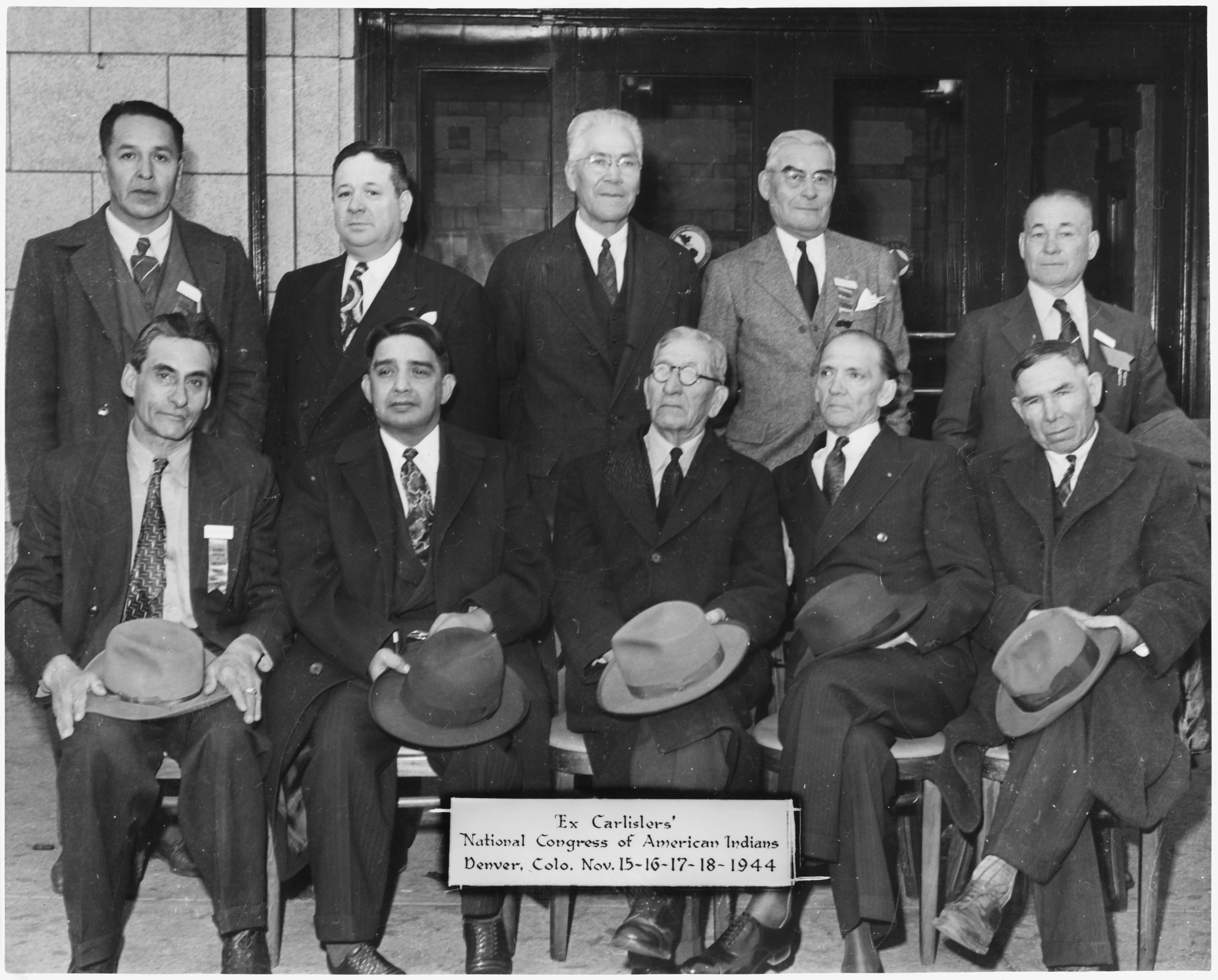
Representatives of various tribes attending organizational meeting, 1944; all were alumni of the Carlisle Indian School.

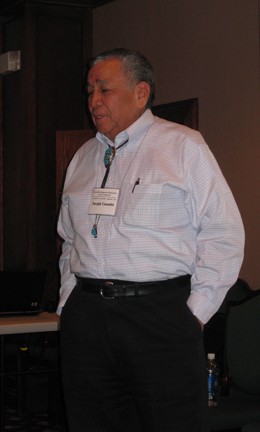
J.T. Goombi (Kiowa), former first vice president of the National Congress of American Indians

Native Americans in the United States have independent governments and distinct cultures, histories, and territories. However, the need to create a unified voice in dealing with the U.S. federal government led to an intertribal coalition.

In the 20th century, a generation of Native Americans came of age who were educated in intertribal boarding schools. They began thinking with a broad pan-Native American vision and learned to form alliances across tribes. They increasingly felt the need to work together politically to exert their power in dealing with the United States federal government. In addition, with the efforts after 1934 to reorganize tribal governments, activists believed that Indians had to work together to strengthen their political position. Activists formed the National Congress of American Indians to find ways to organize the tribes to deal in a more unified way with the US government. They wanted to challenge the government on its failure to implement treaties, to work against the tribal termination policy, and to improve public opinion of and appreciation for Indian cultures.

The NCAI's initial organization was largely created by Native American men who worked for the Bureau of Indian Affairs (BIA) and represented many tribes. Among this group was D'Arcy McNickle of the BIA. At the second national convention, Indian women attended as representatives in numbers equal to the men. The convention decided that BIA employees should be excluded from serving as general officers or members of the executive committee. The first president of the NCAI was Napoleon B. Johnson, a judge in Oklahoma. Dan Madrano (Caddo) was the first secretary-treasurer; he also had been serving as an elected member of the Oklahoma State Legislature. From 1945 to 1952, the executive secretary of the NCAI was Ruth Muskrat Bronson (Cherokee), who established the organization's legislative news service. Bronson's work was largely voluntary, as the organization could not afford to pay her to act as its executive secretary.

In 1950, John Rainer became the first paid executive director of NCAI. He was replaced by Bronson in 1951, who resigned in 1952. Frank George, a Nez Perce from the Colville Indian Reservation, briefly held the post before Helen Peterson (Cheyenne-Lakota) took over the post as the executive director of the organization in 1953. That same year, W. W. Short replaced Johnson as president of NCAI. In 1954, Short was replaced by Joseph Garry (Coeur d'Alene), a veteran of both World War II and the Korean War. Garry significantly enlarged the organizational direction away from its focus on issues of Native Americans in the Great Plains and the Southwest, making it more inclusive of tribes in the Midwest and Northwest.

In 1966, the NCAI mustered nearly 80 tribal leaders from 62 tribes to protest their exclusion from a US-Congress sponsored conference on reorganizing the BIA (Bureau of Indian Affairs). The congressional event was organized by Morris Udall, chairman of the House Committee on Interior and Insular Affairs, to discuss the reorganization of the Bureau of Indian Affairs. Udall eventually allowed the NCAI representatives to attend. He confirmed that the Tribal Advisory Commission, composed of tribe members, would be created to advise him.

During the late 20th century, NCAI contributed to gaining legislation to protect and preserve Indian culture, including NAGPRA. They worked with the tribes to assert their sovereignty in dealing with the federal government.

In the early 21st century, key goals of the NCAI are:

- Enforce for Indians all rights under the Constitution and laws in the United States;
- Expand and improve educational opportunities provided for Indians;
- Improve methods for finding productive employment and developing tribal and individual resources;
- Increase number and quality of health facilities;
- Settle Indian claims equitably; and
- Preserve Indian cultural values.

On November 3, 2009, the Embassy of Tribal Nations was opened in Washington, D.C. The building serves as a headquarters and central meeting place for the NCAI.

In 2013, the NCAI passed a resolution to establish a National American Indian Holocaust Museum space inside a museum of the Smithsonian Institution. However, the Smithsonian has been uncooperative.

In 2017, the NCAI took over the assets of the Indian Country Media Network, which were donated by the Oneida Indian Nation in New York. In March 2021, the publication became independent from the NCAI. "This is an exciting time for Indian Country Today to become fiscally independent and to continue its tradition of an autonomous free press," NCAI President Fawn Sharp said in a press release regarding the change. "This is a new day for ICT, which has a long history as a premier source of news for and about Indigenous communities, written and produced by Indigenous journalists." The publication's current president and CEO is Karen Michel, Ho Chunk.

In 2023, NCAI founded the NCAI Foundation (NCAIF) to promote philanthropy by and for Native American communities.

== Constitution ==
The NCAI Constitution says that its members seek to provide themselves and their descendants with the traditional laws, rights, and benefits. It lists the by-laws and rules of order regarding membership, powers, and dues. There are four classes of membership: tribal, Indian individual, individual associate, and organization associate. Voting rights are reserved for tribal and Indian individual members. According to section B of Article III regarding membership, any tribe, band or group of American Indians and Alaska Natives shall be eligible for tribal membership provided it fulfills the following requirements:

- A substantial number of its members reside upon the same reservation or (in the absence of a reservation) in the same general locality.
- It maintain a Tribal organization, with regular officers and the means of transacting business and arriving at a reasonably accurate count of its membership;
- It is not a mere offshoot or fraction of an organized Tribe itself eligible for membership
- It is recognized as a Tribe or other identifiable group of Native Americans by the Department of the Interior, Court of Claims, the Indian Claims Commission, or a State. An Indian or Alaska Native organization incorporated/chartered under state law is not eligible for tribal membership.

== Achievements ==
The NCAI has maintained a policy of non-protesting. During the 1960s NCAI carried a banner with the slogan, "INDIANS DON'T DEMONSTRATE":

- In 1949, the NCAI made charges against Federal job bias towards the Indians
- In 1950, the NCAI influenced the insertion of an anti-reservation clause to the Alaska Statehood Act. This clause removes the ban against reservations for Alaskan Natives.
- On July 8, 1954, NCAI won its fight against legislation that would have allowed the states to take civil and criminal jurisdictions over Indians.
- On June 19, 1952, a self-help parley was opened in Utah where 50 agents for 12 groups proposed several self-help action plans
- Indians had annual conventions nationwide and dealt with various topics such as health care, employment, and safety issues
- In 2015 the organization successfully lobbied the State of California to ban the term "redskins" from being used by public schools in the state of California.

== Internal policy differences ==
In the early 1960s, a shift in attitude occurred. Many young American Indians branded the older generation as sell-outs and called for harsh militancy. Two important militant groups were born: the American Indian Movement (AIM) and the National Indian Youth Council (NIYC). The two groups protested several conventions.

In 2023, two amendments to the NCAI constitution were proposed which would remove state-recognized tribes from full tribal membership to only associate non-voting tribal membership, as well as require candidates for NCAI national leadership to be enrolled members of federally-recognized tribes. The amendments received the vocal support of the principal chiefs of several federally-recognized tribes including the Cherokee Nation and the Eastern Band of Cherokee Indians. Members from other federally-recognized nations, such as the Tunica-Biloxi and the Little Traverse Bay Bands of Odawa Indians, opposed the measure. After a heated debate, the measures failed with 55.67 percent against and 44.3 percent in support.

After 80 years of existence, NCAI membership has gone from 270 member tribes to 146 member tribes.

== Ongoing issues ==
The advertising firm of DeVito/Verdi created a poster for the NCAI to highlight stereotypical Native American mascots.

The NCAI has been advocating for improved living conditions on reservations, arguing that 560 tribes are federally recognized but fewer than 20 tribes gain profits from casinos to turn the tribe's economy around. Other issues and topics include:

- Protection of programs and services to benefit Indian families, specifically targeting Indian Youth and elders
- Promotion and support of Indian education, including Head Start, elementary, post-secondary and Adult Education
- Enhancement of Indian health care, including prevention of juvenile substance abuse, HIV-AIDS prevention and other major diseases
- Support of environmental protection and natural resources management
- Protection of Indian cultural resources and religious freedom rights
- Promotion of the Rights of Indian economic opportunity both on and off reservations, including securing programs to provide incentives for economic development and the attraction of private capital to Indian Country
- Protection of the Rights of all Indian people to decent, safe and affordable housing.
- Spreading of state-specific information on voter ID requirements through its partnership with the non-partisan VoteRiders organization.

In 2001, the advertising firm of DeVito/Verdi created an advertising campaign and poster for the NCAI to highlight offensive and racist sports team images and mascots. In October 2013, the NCAI published a report on sports teams using harmful and racial "Indian" mascots.

=== Past leadership ===
Past leadership
Year	Meeting location	President	Executive Director
1944	Denver, CO	Napoleon B. Johnson, Cherokee	Ruth Muskrat Bronson, Cherokee
1945	Browning, MT	N.B. Johnson	Ruth Muskrat Bronson
1946	Oklahoma City, OK	N.B. Johnson	Ruth Muskrat Bronson
1947	Santa Fe, NM	N.B. Johnson	Ruth Muskrat Bronson
1948	Denver, CO	N.B. Johnson	Ruth Muskrat Bronson
1949	Rapid City, SD	N.B. Johnson	Louis R. Bruce, St. Regis Mohawk, Edward Rogers, Minnesota Chippewa
1950	Bellingham, WA	N.B. Johnson	John C. Rainer, Taos Pueblo
1951	St. Paul, MN	N.B. Johnson	Ruth Muskrat Bronson, Cherokee
1952	Denver, CO	N.B. Johnson	Frank George, Colville
1953	Phoenix, AZ	Joseph R. Garry, Coeur D'Alene	Helen Peterson, Oglala Lakota
1954	Omaha, NE	Joseph R. Garry	Helen Peterson
1955	Spokane, WA	Joseph R. Garry	Helen Peterson
1956	Salt Lake City, UT	Joseph R. Garry	Helen Peterson
1957	Claremore, OK	Joseph R. Garry	Helen Peterson
1958	Missoula, MT	Joseph R. Garry	Helen Peterson
1959	Phoenix, AZ	Joseph R. Garry	Helen Peterson
1960	Denver, CO	Walter Wetzel, Blackfeet	Robert Burnett, Rosebud Sioux
1961	Lewiston, ID	Walter Wetzel	Robert Burnett
1962	Cherokee, NC	Walter Wetzel	Robert Burnett
1963	Bismarck, ND	Walter Wetzel	Robert Burnett
1964	Sheridan, WY	Walter Wetzel	Vine Deloria Jr., Standing Rock Sioux
1965	Scottsdale, AZ	Clarence Wesley, San Carlos Apache	Vine Deloria, Jr.
1966	Oklahoma City, OK	Clarence Wesley	Vine Deloria, Jr.
1967	Portland, OR	Wendell Chino, Mescalero Apache	Vine Deloria, Jr.
1968	Omaha, NE	Wendell Chino	John Belindo, Navajo/Kiowa
1969	Albuquerque, NM	Earl Old Person, Blackfeet	Bruce Wilkie, Makah
1970	Anchorage, AK	Earl Old Person	Franklin Ducheneaux, Cheyenne River Sioux
1971	Reno, NV	Leon F. Cook, Red Lake Chippewa	Leo W. Vocu, Oglala Sioux
1972	Sarasota, FL	Leon F. Cook	Charles Trimble, Oglala Sioux
1973	Tulsa, OK	Mel Tonasket, Colville	Charles Trimble
1974	San Diego, CA	Mel Tonasket	Charles Trimble
1975	Portland, OR	Mel Tonasket	Charles Trimble
1976	Salt Lake City, UT	Mel Tonasket	Charles Trimble
1977	Dallas, TX	Veronica L. Murdock, Mohave (Colorado River Indian Tribes)	Charles Trimble
1978	Rapid City, SD	Veronica L. Murdock	Andrew E. Ebona, Tlingit
1979	Albuquerque, NM	Edward Driving Hawk, Sioux	Ronald Andrade, Luiseño/Kumeyaay
1980	Spokane, WA	Edward Driving Hawk	Ronald Andrade
1981	Anchorage, AK	Joseph DeLaCruz, Quinault	Ronald Andrade
1982	Bismarck, ND	Joseph DeLaCruz	Ronald Andrade
1983	Green Bay, WI	Joseph DeLaCruz	Silas Whitman, Nez Perce
1984	Spokane, WA	Joseph DeLaCruz	Suzan Shown Harjo, Cheyenne/Muscogee
1985	Tulsa, OK	Reuben A. Snake Jr., Winnebago Tribe of Nebraska	Suzan Shown Harjo
1986	Phoenix, AZ	Reuben A. Snake Jr.	Suzan Shown Harjo
1987	Tampa, FL	Reuben A. Snake Jr.	Suzan Shown Harjo
1988	Sioux City, SD	John Gonzales, San Ildefonso Pueblo	Suzan Shown Harjo
1989	Oklahoma City, OK	John Gonzales	Suzan Shown Harjo
1990	Albuquerque, NM	Wayne L. Ducheneaux, Cheyenne River Sioux	A. Gay Kingman, Cheyenne River Sioux
1991	San Francisco, CA	Wayne L. Ducheneaux	A. Gay Kingman
1992	Arlington, VA	gaiashkibos, Lac Courte Oreilles	Michael J. Anderson, Creek/Choctaw
1993	Reno, NV	gaiashkibos	Rachel A. Joseph, Shoshone/Paiute/Mono
1994	Denver, CO	gaiashkibos	JoAnn K. Chase, Mandan/Hidatsa/Arikara
1995	San Diego, CA	gaiashkibos	JoAnn K. Chase
1996	Phoenix, AZ	W. Ron Allen, Jamestown S’Klallam	JoAnn K. Chase
1997	Santa Fe, NM	W. Ron Allen	JoAnn K. Chase
1998	Myrtle Beach, SC	W. Ron Allen	JoAnn K. Chase
1999	Palm Springs, CA	W. Ron Allen	JoAnn K. Chase
2000	St. Paul, MN	Susan Masten, Yurok	JoAnn K. Chase
2001	Spokane, WA	Susan Masten	Jacqueline Johnson, Tlingit
2002	San Diego, CA	Tex G. Hall, Mandan/Hidatsa/Arikara	Jacqueline Johnson
2003	Albuquerque, NM	Tex Hall	Jacqueline Johnson
2004	Fort Lauderdale, FL	Tex Hall	Jacqueline Johnson
2005	Tulsa, OK	Tex Hall	Jacqueline Johnson
2006	Sacramento, CA	Joe A. Garcia, Ohkay Owingeh	Jacqueline Johnson
2007	Denver, CO	Joe A. Garcia	Jacqueline Johnson
2008	Phoenix, AZ	Joe A. Garcia	Jacqueline Johnson Pata
2009	Palm Springs, CA	Joe A. Garcia	Jacqueline Johnson Pata
2010	Albuquerque, NM	Jefferson Keel, Chickasaw	Jacqueline Johnson Pata
2011	Portland, OR	Jefferson Keel	Jacqueline Johnson Pata
2012	Sacramento, CA	Jefferson Keel	Jacqueline Johnson Pata
2013	Tulsa, OK	Jefferson Keel	Jacqueline Johnson Pata
2014	Atlanta, Georgia	Brian Cladoosby, Swinomish	Jacqueline Johnson Pata
2015	San Diego, CA	Brian Cladoosby	Jacqueline Johnson Pata
2016	Phoenix, AZ	Brian Cladoosby	Jacqueline Pata
2017	Milwaukee, WI	Brian Cladoosby	Jacqueline Pata
2018	Denver, CO	Jefferson Keel	Jacqueline Pata
2019	Albuquerque, NM	Jefferson Keel	Kevin Allis
2020		Fawn Sharp, Quinault	
2021		Fawn Sharp	
2022		Fawn Sharp	Jefferson Keel
2023	New Orleans, LA	Mark Macarro, Pechanga	

== Notable members ==
- Ruth Muskrat Bronson, executive director (1944–48) and a specialist in American Indian affairs
- Vine Deloria, Jr., executive director (1964–1967). He ended major legislative battles
- Susan Shown Harjo, executive director (1984–1989)
- J. B. Milam: founding member
- Ira Hayes: American hero during the battle of Iwo Jima, and also made a speech in the congress.
- Nipo T. Strongheart performer-lecturer and technical advisor on several Hollywood films involving Native Americans and a cofounder.

== See also ==
- American Indian Movement
- Assembly of First Nations
- Congress of Aboriginal Peoples
- National Indian Youth Council
- Society of American Indians

== Bibliography ==
- National Congress of American Indians: Constitution, By-Laws and Standing Rules of Order. Found on the official NCAI website, this article was last amended in 2007. It states the purpose of the NCAI, the different types of memberships, and the rules and regulations.
- Cowger, Thomas W. (1999). The National Congress of American Indians : the founding years. Lincoln, Nebraska: University of Nebraska Press. ISBN 978-0-8032-1502-3.
- Deloria, Vine Jr. Custer Died for Your Sins: An Indian Manifesto. New York: Avon Books, 1970. This book explores the reality and myths surrounding Indians, the problems of leadership, and modern Indian affairs.
- Johnson, N B. The National Congress of American Indians. Written by the Justice of Supreme Court of Oklahoma and published in the Chronicles of Oklahoma, this article discusses the formation of the NCAI, and Congress'reaction.
- Report of Activities, American Association on Indian Affairs, June 1945–May 1946. This article discusses the reasons why a nationwide organization of Indians is so crucial.
- Shreve, Bradley G. "From Time Immemorial: The Fish-in Movement and the Rise of the Intertribal Activism", Pacific Historical Review 78.3 (2009): 403–434, JSTOR 10.1525/phr.2009.78.3.403?
- Cowger, Thomas W. The National Congress of American Indians: The Founding Years. Lincoln, NE: University of Nebraska Press, 1999.
