= Robert Aquino =

Pueblo-American painter

- Citizenship: American, Ohkay Owingeh Pueblo
- Education: Santa Fe Indian School
- Occupation: painter

Robert Aquino is a Pueblo-American painter from the Ohkay Owingeh (San Juan) Pueblo. He studied at the Santa Fe Indian School and has exhibited his work across the country. Some of his works are in the permanent collection of institutions including the Museum of New Mexico.
