= Lorencita Atencio =

Pueblo-American artist

Lorencita Atencio Bird
- T'o Pove
- Born: October 22, 1918; San Juan Pueblo, New Mexico, US
- Died: May 4, 1995 (aged 76)
- Citizenship: American, Ohkay Owingeh Pueblo
- Education: Santa Fe Indian School
- Occupations: painter and textile artist

"Matachines Dance," 1937, depicts an intricate dance popular in Ohkay Owingeh Pueblo.

Lorencita Atencio Bird (October 22, 1918 – May 4, 1995), also called T'o Pove (Tewa: Tʼo Póvi transl. "Flowering Piñon"), was a Pueblo-American painter and textile artist from the Ohkay Owingeh (San Juan) Pueblo. She studied at the Santa Fe Indian School under Dorothy Dunn and exhibited her artwork across the country and in Europe. In particular, she is known for her embroidery designs, utilizing symbolic colors and motifs such as diamonds, butterflies, and the color gold. Her artworks can be found in private collections including the Margretta S. Dietrich Collection and in museums including the Heard Museum, the Gilcrease Museum, the Philbrook Museum of Art, and the Wheelwright Museum of the American Indian.

Atencio was born on October 22, 1918, the daughter of Juan Bautista and Luteria Trujillo Atencio. She was an active watercolor painter and embroidery artist through the 1930s and 1940s, selling her work and earning a living. Some of her paintings depicted subjects going about daily tasks, such as gathering water. In the 1950s, she became the mother of several children and stopped painting as prolifically. She continued to work on weaving and embroidery throughout her life, creating sashes, ceremonial regalia, and wedding attire. Atencio also worked as a crafts instructor at the Santa Fe Indian School and at the U. S. Albuquerque Indian School.

Atencio died on May 4, 1995.
