= Emiliano Abeyta =

Pueblo-American painter

- Sa Pa
- Born: 1911
- Died: 1981 (aged 69–70)

Abeyta's 1933 watercolor Two Antelope Dancers, now in the collection of the National Museum of the American Indian

Emiliano Abeyta (1911–1981), also called Sa Pa, was a twentieth-century Pueblo-American painter from the Ohkay Owingeh (San Juan Pueblo) tribe. From 1933 to 1934, he was an artist in the Public Works of Art Project as part of the New Deal. Already an established artist by that time, he worked for the program out of the Santa Fe Indian School in Santa Fe, New Mexico. Later, in the 1950s, his work was part of the University of Oklahoma European Tours, for which the university's College of Fine Arts curated a collection of paintings for the U.S. Information Service to exhibit across Europe. Abeyta's work is in the permanent collection of the Smithsonian National Museum of the American Indian and the University of Oklahoma.
