= Juan B. Aquino =

American painter

- Shaking Eagle Tail
- Born: 1942
- Died: 1993 (aged 50–51)
- Education: Bacone College

Juan B. Aquino (1942–1993), also called Shaking Eagle Tail, was a Pueblo-American painter from the Ohkay Owingeh (San Juan) Pueblo. He was educated at Bacone College and exhibited his work across the country. Aquino sold his works, including paintings, woodcarvings, and corn cob dolls, under the moniker Aquino's Indian Arts and Crafts. Some of his works are in the permanent collection of institutions including the Museum of New Mexico.
