= Wayne Ducheneaux =

Wayne Leo Ducheneaux (September 25, 1936 – December 17, 2012) was a rancher, United States Marine, and leader of the Cheyenne River Sioux Tribe, being elected to the tribal council in 1966 and as its chairman for two terms the first from 1974 to 1978 and the second from 1986 to 1990. He served as president of the National Congress of American Indians from 1990 to 1991.
