= Evelina Zuni Lucero =

Puebloan writer

- Born: October 10, 1953 (age 72)
- Citizenship: US
- Education: Stanford University
- Occupations: Novelist; journalist; creative writing professor
- Writing career
- Language: English
- Notable works: ‘’Night Sky, Morning Star’’
- Notable awards: First Book Award (Native Writers’ Circle of the Americas)
- Movement: Native American fiction

Evelina Zuni Lucero (born October 10, 1953) is a Native American (Isleta Pueblo/Ohkay Owingeh) novelist, poet and journalist. Her novel Night Sky, Morning Star won the 1999 First Book Award from the Native Writers' Circle of the Americas.

== Personal life ==
Lucero grew up in Isleta Pueblo until the age of eight, after which her family moved to Colorado and Nevada. She joined the Stanford University program of Native American Studies in its inaugural year, and then became a journalist working with Native groups. During this time, she met and interviewed Pueblo poet Simon Ortiz, who she describes as a formative influence on her writing: “here before me was an Indian author, a Pueblo no less, who wrote of people and places with which I was familiar, who showed in his poems and stories that our lives were as important and worthy as any. Like coyote, he had been all over the country, working all kinds of jobs, meeting all kinds of people, and then writing about those experiences.” Lucero lives at Isleta Pueblo and teaches at the Institute of American Indian Arts in Santa Fe, New Mexico. She has also acted as a community organizer at Isleta for Headstart and other educational/artistic programs.

Lucero currently serves as Chair of Creative Writing at the Institute of American Indian Arts.

== Publication history ==
Lucero is known for her novel Night Sky, Morning Star (1999). The book tells the stories of Pueblo artist Cecelia Bluespruce and her extended family, especially her estranged son Jude. Lucero interleaves these chapters with others told by Julian Morningstar James, Jude's father and the Morning Star of the title, who has been unjustly imprisoned for crimes supposedly committed when he was an activist for the American Indian Movement. James’ story has parallels with that of real-life political prisoner Leonard Peltier, and Lucero has stated that “When I gave it thought, a Native prisoner was a fitting characterization of the Indian experience in the Americas." Reviewer Annette Van Dyke states that the resemblance between Cecelia and Julian's story and that of the traditional Tiwa story of the deer man - “someone who lures women away from family, friends and proper behavior and then betrays them” – is a central question of the novel, one that is eventually resolved. Van Dyke argues that Lucero is perhaps overly concerned with escaping the shadow of Leslie Marmon Silko and that her novel lacks some of the humor of other recent Native American fiction, but concludes that the novel gives readers “a good glimpse into contemporary Tiwa-speaking Pueblo life.” Stuart Christie argues that, as in Jeannette Armstrong’s novel Slash, Lucero illustrates the power of love as "an important […] anchor linking imprisoned Native North American men and women to their traditions and people outside the prison walls".

Lucero has also published short stories and has worked as a journalist since the 1970s.

== Awards ==
- First Book Award from the Native Writers’ Circle of the Americas (1999).
- Civitella Ranieri Fellow (Civitella Ranieri International Artist Center, 1999).

== Works ==
Books

- Night Sky, Morning Star. First Book Award Series. Tucson: University of Arizona Press. 2000. ISBN 978-0816520558.
- Simon J. Ortiz: A Poetic Legacy of Indigenous Continuance. (Co-edited with Susan Berry Brill de Ramirez). Albuquerque: University of New Mexico Press. 2009. ISBN 978-0826339881.

Essays

- Lucero, Evelina Zuni (2000). "On the Tip of My Tongue: An Autobiographical Essay". In Krupat, Arnold; Swann, Brian (eds.). Here First: Autobiographical Essays by Native American Writers. Modern Library Paperbacks. New York: Random House. pp. 247–261. ISBN 978-0375751387.
