= Burke Library =

Academic library system in New York

Coordinates: 40.8110°N 73.9616°W

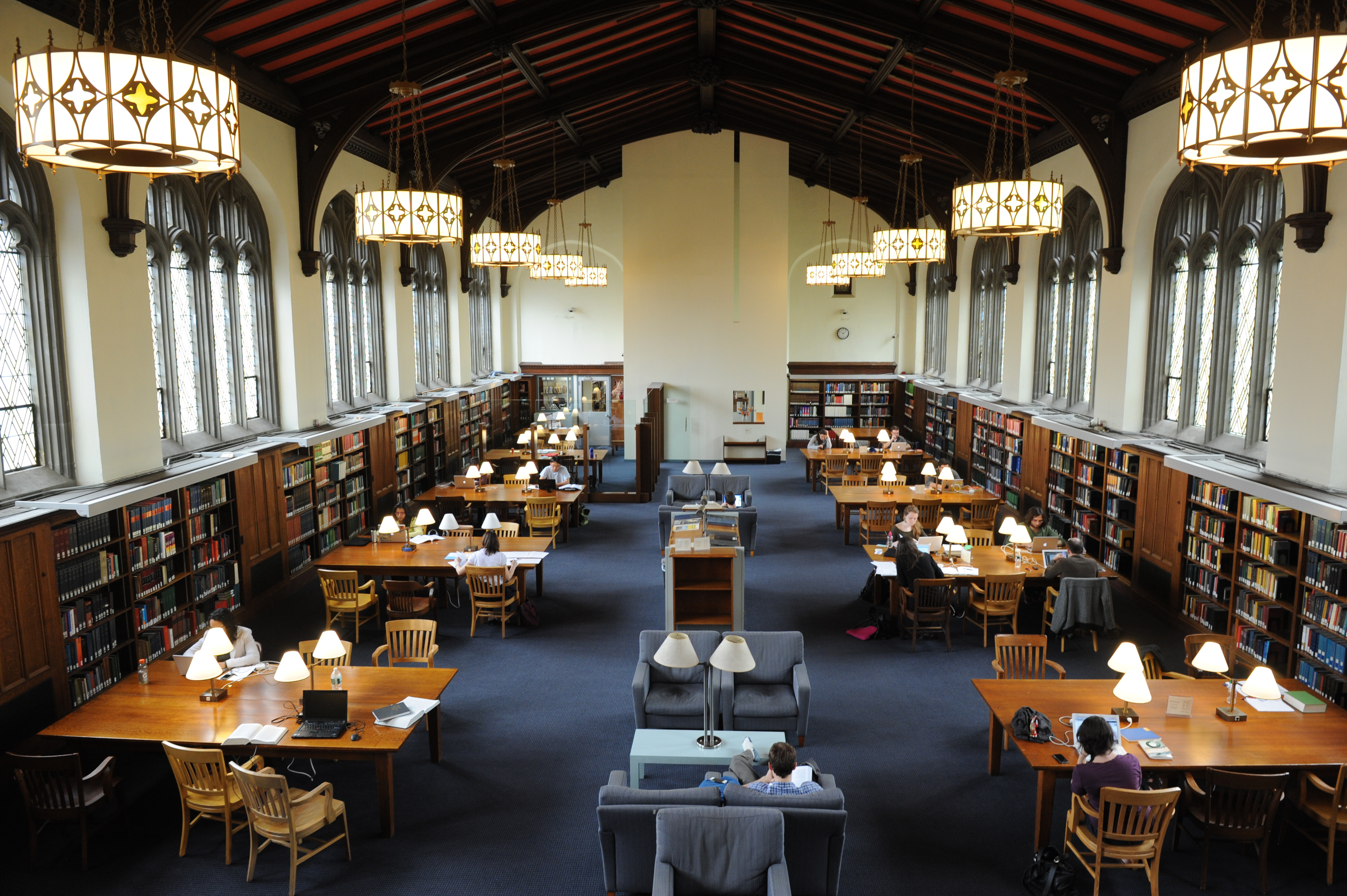
The Burke Library reading room

Burke Library of the Union Theological Seminary is located at 3041 Broadway, in the Morningside Heights neighborhood of Manhattan, New York City. Founded in 1838, since 2004 it has been a part of the Columbia University Libraries. Holding over 700,000 items, it is one of the largest theological libraries in North America.

Burke Library began with the purchase of the Leander van Ess collection in 1838, described by Cornell University professor Thomas Frederick Crane as "the most valuable library which has ever been brought into the country." The van Ess collection can be traced back to the library of the Benedictine abbey at Marienmünster, where van Ess was a member. Following the 1801 Treaty of Lunéville, the monastery's library was split among its members in preparation for its dissolution under Napoleon; van Ess' portion would eventually be sold to the Union Theological Seminary. The collection consisted of around 13,000 volumes, especially rich in pre-1500 incunabula; original editions of patristic literature; Roman Catholic theology, liturgies, and canon law; early Greek, Latin, Hebrew, and polyglot editions of the Bible; as well as a significant group of pamphlets written by Martin Luther written during the 1520s. Early librarians included professors Edward Robinson, Henry Boynton Smith, and Charles Augustus Briggs.

The library would continue to grow, reaching a size of 115,000 volumes by 1899, making it the largest American theological seminary library and tenth-largest college library in general at the time. Notable acquisitions during the time include the McAlpin collection, donated by David Hunter McAlpin; donations from Ezra Hall Gillett, Samuel Hanson Cox, William Buell Sprague, and John Marsh; as well as a 7,000 volume gift from Edwin Francis Hatfield. In 1880, New York Governor Edwin D. Morgan donated $100,000 to the library, which went toward the construction of a new building for the library and the establishment of a permanent fund.

Due to increasing costs, Burke Library was acquired by the library of Columbia University, which the Union Theological Seminary is affiliated with, in 2004. Its collections were fully integrated into those of the Columbia Libraries, while allowing Union Theological Seminary and Columbia students and faculty full access to either institution's libraries.

== See also ==
- G.E.E. Lindquist Native American Photographs Collection
