= Embassy of Tribal Nations =

Embassy located in Washington, D.C.

Coordinates: 38.90944°N 77.03537°W

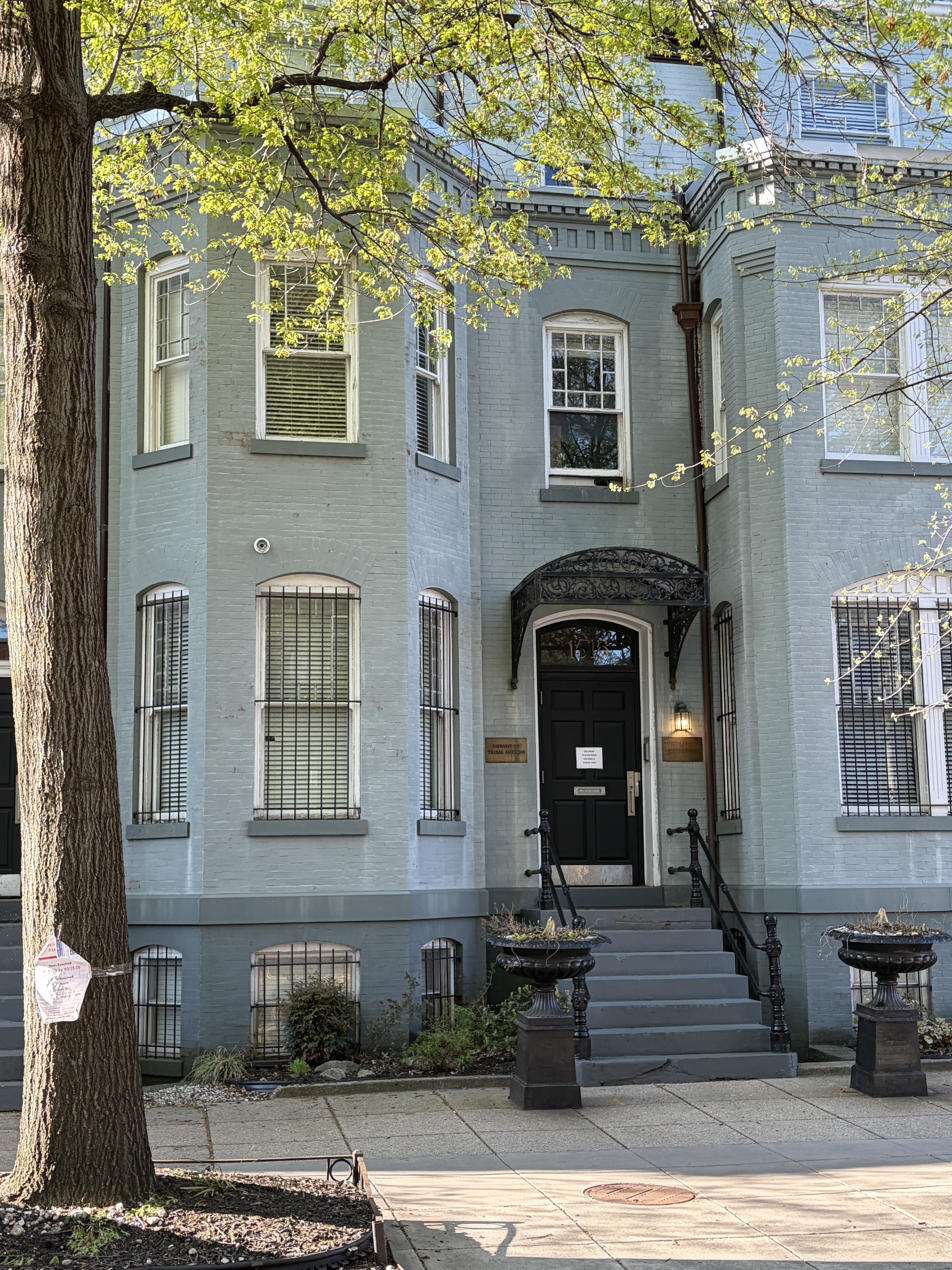
The Embassy of Tribal Nations at 1516 P Street NW in Washington, D.C.

The Embassy of Tribal Nations is an embassy located in Washington, D.C., that provides a center of operations to the National Congress of American Indians (NCAI). It was established on November 3, 2009 and allowed the NCAI and other tribal groups an opportunity to meet in a designated location. The existence of the embassy in the United States capital allows international relations between tribes and the U.S. government to be conducted close to each other.

== History ==
The National Congress of American Indians had been planning to create a headquarters to conduct all political and financial business since as early as the eighties. Before the Embassy of Tribal Nations was established, the NCAI rented a building. The estate in Washington, D.C., is three stories and was built in the 19th century. NCAI members began raising money with assistance from tribes in the 2000s, and bought the 17,000 square foot, $8.5 million property in April 2009. The space was remodeled to fit the needs of its new residents, and adorned with traditional Indian artwork and relics.

=== Donors ===
David Anderson, founder of the "Famous Dave" restaurants and former head of the Bureau of Indian Affairs, donated $50,000 to the cause in 2006.

== Opening ==
The grand opening on November 3, 2009 brought in large numbers of Natives to honor the launch of the new resource, celebrating with food and traditional dances. President Jefferson Keel of the NCAI revealed his thoughts in a press release that day: "For the first time since settlement, tribal nations will have a permanent home in Washington, D.C. where they can more effectively assert their sovereign status and facilitate a much stronger nation-to-nation relationship with the federal government."

=== Notable guests ===
Fort Hall Business Council Chairman Alonzo Coby, along with 28 other tribal leaders, was present at the event. Two days later, Coby met with President Obama at the Tribal Nations conference, serving as an ambassador for the Shoshone-Bannock tribes.

== Today ==
One of the buildings is used by other Native American groups, the Native American Rights Fund and the Native American Contractors Association. The embassy serves as a tangible manifestation of a connection between the United States government and Native Americans, and the NCAI updates their website regularly to keep the public aware of their happenings.
