= Veronica Murdock =

American civil servant (1944–2024)

Veronica Homer
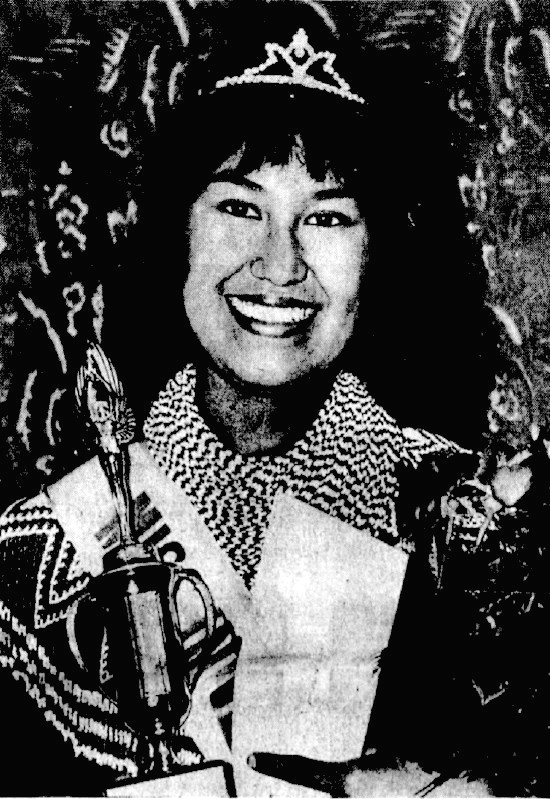
- Miss Indian Arizona, 1961
- Born: Veronica Lee Homer; 1944; Parker, Arizona
- Died: March 5, 2024 (aged 79–80)
- Occupations: tribal government official, federal civil servant, Native American activist
- Years active: 1967–2024

Veronica Homer (1944 – March 5, 2024) was an American civil servant and of Shasta–Mohave ancestry, as a member of the Colorado River Indian Tribes. She served in the tribal administration, including as vice chair, of the Colorado River Tribe from 1969 to 1979 and between 1977 and 1979 as the first woman president of the National Congress of American Indians. From 1980 to 2004, she served as a civil service employee with the Bureau of Indian Affairs.

== Early life ==
Veronica L. Homer was born in 1944 to Alice (née Courts) and Pete Homer Sr. Her mother's heritage included the California Shasta and she grew up in Cottage Grove, Siskiyou County, California. Her father was Mohave and he worked as an actor and served as the Chair of the Colorado River Indian Tribes from 1954 to 1964. The couple met when Pete was acting with Paramount Pictures and Alice was working in the wardrobe department. Homer was one of eight siblings, including: four sisters Denise, Marlene, Vicki, Sylvia "Cindy" and three brothers, Pete Jr., John and Gary. She attended Parker High School in Parker, Arizona. In 1961, Homer won the inaugural Miss Indian Arizona pageant, while a freshman at Arizona State University. Her title led to recognition and an invitation to serve as the majorette and leader for the Arizona Inter–Tribal Band in the Inaugural Parade of President John F. Kennedy.

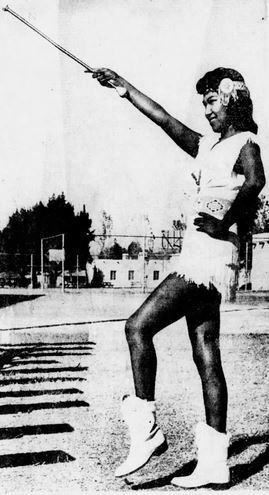
Veronica Homer, practicing as majorette for the John F. Kennedy Inaugural, 1961

== Career ==
Homer married Leonard A. Enos (1944–1967), but he was killed in action during the Vietnam War. Around the time of his death, Homer began working as the director of the Colorado River Indian Reservation Neighborhood Youth Corps. She had remarried by 1969 with Myron H. Murdock, an Oklahoma Kickapoo, who worked as the production manager of Prest-Wheel, Inc. The company, owned by Giffen Industries in Massachusetts, and operated on land owned by the Colorado River Tribe, manufactured aluminum and redwood furniture. In 1970, the couple's daughter, Alice was born and Homer, whose political activism was rising, encouraged her father to teach her daughter the Mojave language. After two years directing the youth corps, Homer ran and was elected in 1969 for a two-year term as the vice chair of the tribe. Homer was involved in resource development, health care, job training and numerous other projects to improve the lives of her community. Throughout the 1970s, she continued to serve on the tribal council as either the recording secretary or vice chair.

In 1977, Homer was elected as the first woman to serve as the president of the National Congress of American Indians (NCAI). During her tenure in 1978, NCAI hosted a "National Conference on Tribal Recognition" in Nashville. At issue was a discussion of federal requirements for indigenous groups gaining federal recognition. Like many others who were skeptical about newly organized groups misappropriating Native American heritage, Homer favored the BIA documentation process. She was also concerned, because the previous decades' termination policies had only recently restored traditional lands and sovereignty to Native American nations, that there would be backlash from the mainstream culture. She pointed to policies of the Carter administration, which she believed were undermining indigenous water rights, land claims, and funding for programs to improve education and other social initiatives. In 1979, she led the NCAI convention in Albuquerque, A Challenge for the 80s: Political Unity, which focused on inter-governmental relationships, law, and justice, as well as economic and social issues.

Beginning in 1980, Homer was appointed by the Bureau of Indian Affairs (BIA), as a Tribal Operations Specialist, and worked at the Colorado River Agency for seven years. She was transferred in 1987 to Carson City, Nevada, where she worked as a Tribal Operations Officer for BIA's Western Nevada Agency. After two years, she was promoted as a special assistant to the Assistant Secretary for Indian Affairs in the United States Secretary of the Interior and was stationed in Washington, D.C. In 1994, Homer became the Superintendent of the Salt River Agency in Scottsdale, Arizona. As Superintendent of the BIA agency office, she served the Fort McDowell Yavapai Nation, the Pascua Yaqui Tribe and the Salt River Pima–Maricopa Indian Community.

Homer retired from federal service in 2004 and became one of the founders of Women Empowering Women for Indian Nations (WEWIN). Along with Susan Masten (Yurok), Homer served as co-president. Founding board members included Nora Antone (Mojave-Hopi-Tewa), Melanie Benjamin (Ojibwe), Cecilia Fire Thunder (Oglala Sioux), Rachel Joseph (Shoshone-Paiute-Mono), Wilma Mankiller (Cherokee), Patricia Parker (Choctaw), Geri Small (Northern Cheyenne), and H. Sally Smith (Curyung Tribe). The organization was founded to encourage indigenous women to serve as leaders and role models in their communities. She also served as chair of the First Things First Colorado River Indian Tribes Regional Partnership Council.

Homer died on March 5, 2024, at the age of 80.

== See also ==
- List of Native American politicians
- Native American women in politics
