= Leonidas Tapia =

American Puebloan potter

- Died: 1977
- Citizenship: American Pueblo
- Occupation: Puebloan potter
- Spouse: Jose Blas Tapia
- Children: Mary Trujillo (b. 1937); Tom Tapia (b. 1946)

Leonidas Tapia (died 1977) was a Puebloan potter from Ohkay Owingeh, New Mexico, United States.

== Biography ==
She was the wife of Jose Blas Tapia and mother of Mary Trujillo (born 1937) and Tom Tapia (b. 1946). Leonidas made traditional San Juan polychrome redware bowls, jars and wedding vases. She also made micaceous pottery. Some of the designs she used on her pottery include the water serpent, kiva steps and clouds. Leonidas participated in the Santa Fe Indian Market from 1970 to 1976.

Tapia's son, Tom Tapia, learned to make pottery by working with his mother. He works in the sgraffito style and has won numerous awards for his pottery. He also makes pottery with his wife Sue Tapia. Tapia's daughter, Mary Trujillo, married Helen Cordero's son, Leonard, from Cochiti Pueblo. She learned to make storyteller figures from her mother-in-law Helen who was the first and most famous maker of Cochiti storytellers and has won numerous awards.
