= Church of San Juan Bautista (Ohkay Owingeh) =

Church and parish in New Mexico, US

San Juan Bautista Catholic Church
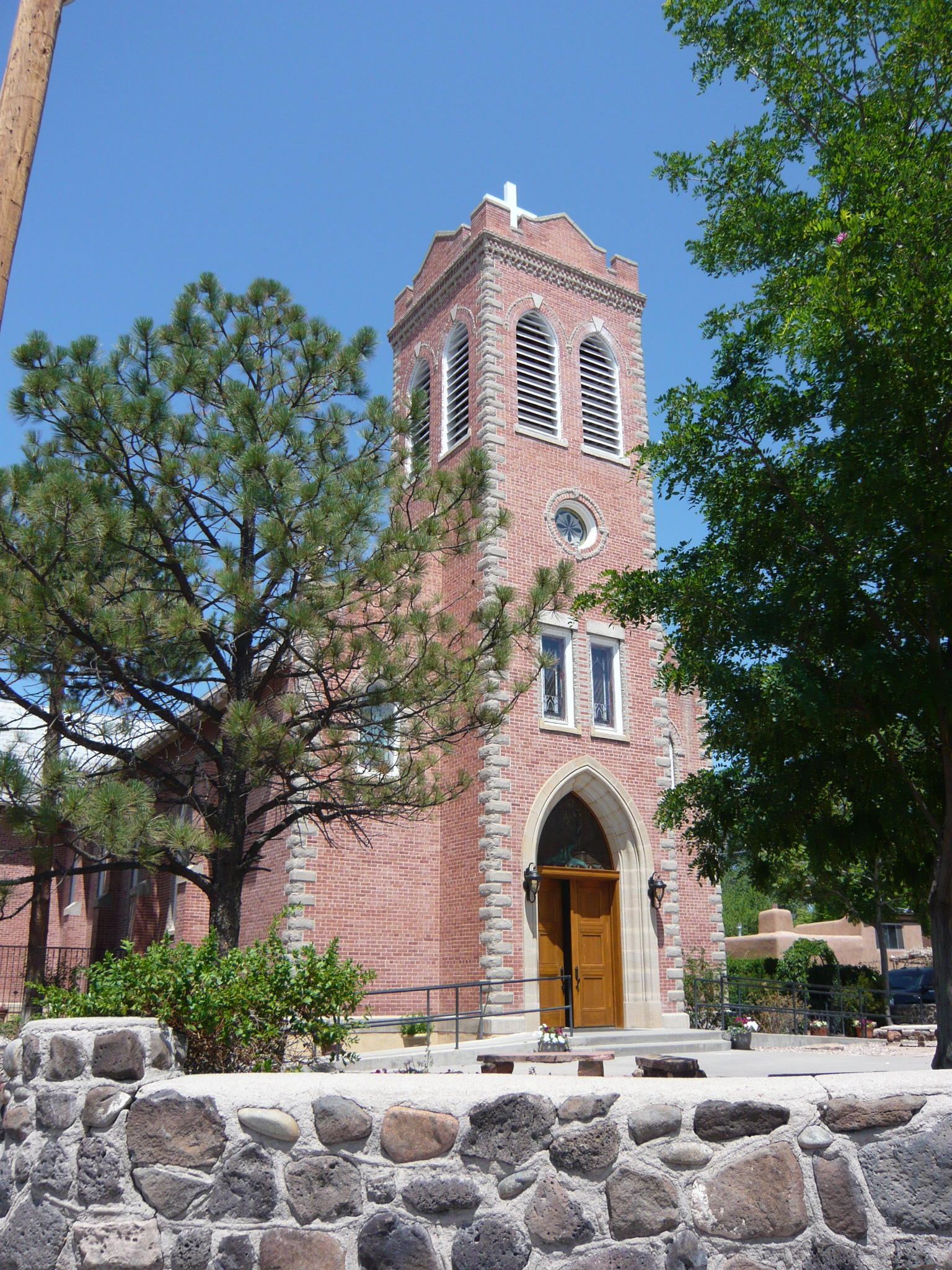
- Location: 185 Po'Pay Ave, Ohkay Owingeh, NM 87566
- Country: USA
- Denomination: Roman Catholic
- Website: https://www.sanjuanandtewa.com/

History
- Founded: 1598
- Founder: Juan de Oñate y Salazar

Administration
- Diocese: Archdiocese of Santa Fe

Clergy
- Pastor: Fr. Nathan Lopez

The Church of San Juan Bautista (Tewa: Méesateh Hayˀiˀ) is a Roman Catholic church and parish located in Ohkay Owingeh (formerly San Juan Pueblo), New Mexico. The parish is part of the Roman Catholic Archdiocese of Santa Fe. It consists of the parish church of St John the Baptist, a freestanding chapel dedicated to Our Lady of Lourdes, and ten associated missions. The parish traces its origins to 1598, making it the oldest extant Native American congregation in the United States of America, as well as one of the oldest church congregations in the United States in general. The current church, the parish's fifth or sixth, (Note: Some sources state that the previous adobe church, demolished in 1912, was the parish's fourth. Other sources, however, recognize up to six churches for the parish.) was built in 1913 and is listed as a contributing property on the National Register of Historic Places.

== Church ==
The current San Juan Bautista Church was built in 1912–1913. This church building is either the fifth or sixth to serve the parish. The church is constructed of stone and red brick, and is neo-Gothic in architectural style. It features wood floors, marble altars, and stained glass windows. This stands in sharp contrast to most of the surrounding buildings, which are low adobe structures. Consequently, the National Park Service notes that the brick church "belies a long history of interaction between the Spanish and Pueblo Indians in New Mexico". Strictly speaking, however, the architecture of the church is the result of French cultural influence in the Diocese of Santa Fe beginning in the mid-nineteenth century. The church plaza features a statue of the Immaculate Conception, erected in 1888. In 2013, the church received a new entry way, featuring a relief of the Baptism of Jesus, in honor of the parish's 415th anniversary.

As of 2024, the pastor of the church is Fr. Nathan Lopez. According to the church's website, there are 1,200 families registered with the parish. The church hosts Holy Hour, and has several choirs, which sing in the Tewa language, in Spanish, and Gregorian chant. The church offers Religious Education (CCD) to over 400 youths. The parish feast is celebrated on June 24, the Nativity of John the Baptist.

=== Chapel of Our Lady of Lourdes ===
Opposite of the church is a small chapel dedicated as a shrine to Our Lady of Lourdes. Built in the neo-Gothic style out of lava rock by architects Antoine and Projectus Mouly, the shrine was dedicated in 1890. The interior of the shrine features a grotto modeled after that at Lourdes. In 2004, the shrine was restored and rededicated by Archbishop Michael J. Sheehan.

== Parish history ==
Ohkay Owingeh was first settled by Tewa-speaking Pueblo peoples after the great Pueblo migration around 1200. In 1598, the Spanish under Juan de Oñate arrived at the pueblo, bringing with them Spanish colonial control and Catholicism. On August 23, 1598, the Spanish began to build a church at San Gabriel de Yungue-Ouinge, and the first Mass was celebrated there on September 8, 1598. It is to this first church that the parish traces its lineage.

This first church was likely of simple construction. Known as the Church of San Miguel, it was dedicated to St. Michael the Archangel. It was a Mission church under the religious authority of the Franciscan Friars. Sometime after the construction of this first rudimentary church, it was replaced by a second, larger church.

In 1643, a third church was built, at a new location closer to Ohkay Owingeh, which by then was known as San Juan Pueblo. This new church was called Mission San Juan Bautista, being dedicated to St. John the Baptist. This building was likely destroyed during the Pueblo Revolt of 1680. Under the leadership of Popé, a resident of San Juan Pueblo (Ohkay Owingeh), this native uprising drove the Spanish out of New Mexico for 12 years.

Mission San Juan Bautista was later re-established by the Franciscans. A new church, the fourth, was built in 1706 at a site within San Juan Pueblo (Ohkay Owingeh) itself. In around 1760, this church was either completely rebuilt or demolished and replaced by a new structure. This work was undertaken under the direction of Fray Juan José Pérez de Mirabal. The resulting church was a narrow adobe structure, measuring 22 feet wide by 110 feet long. The interior was furnished by an altarpiece, paid for by Governor Tomás Vélez Cachupín, that was painted red, blue, and yellow (the colors of the Spanish Crown). The Nave featured paintings of saints on buffalo hides. The façade featured a single bell-gable, the bells of which were rung by being stuck by stones.

In 1826 the mission was secularized, and the church became a diocesan parish. The first pastor was Fr. Juan Felipe Ortiz. By this point, San Juan Pueblo (Ohkay Owingeh) was Mexican territory, Mexico having achieved independence from Spain in 1821. After the Mexican-American War and Treaty of Guadalupe Hidalgo in 1848, control of the area passed to the United States.

In 1868, Fr. Camille Seux became the pastor of San Juan Bautista parish. Popularly known as Padre Camilo, he was born in Lyon, France and was one of numerous French clergy to arrive in the Diocese of Santa Fe under the influence of Bishop Jean-Baptiste Lamy. He would serve the parish for 53 years, and would prove to be one of its most transformative priests. Under Fr. Seux, the adobe church was renovated during the 1870s, being whitewashed and receiving a new altar. San Juan Bautista became a favored retreat for the priests of Santa Fe. Other changes in the parish soon followed. An organ was acquired for the church. In 1888, Fr. Seux erected in the church yard a life-sized statute of Our Lady of the Immaculate Conception, a copy of that at Lourdes in France, which was blessed on April 9 of that year by Archbishop Jean Baptiste Salpointe. Once this statue began to attract pilgrims, Fr. Seux financed the construction of a neo-Gothic chapel, dedicated as a shrine to Our Lady of Lourdes, across from the adobe church. This was blessed by Archbishop Salpointe on June 19, 1890, with 23 priests in attendance. By this time, the exterior of the adobe church had been completely renovated by Fr. Seux, receiving a plaster coating, inscribed with lines to simulate masonry, new windows and millwork, and a new roofline with a belfry and spire. Additionally, Fr. Seux built a two-story rectory and a parochial school. San Juan Bautista became something of a showcase within the diocese, and it received a visit by James Cardinal Gibbons, Archbishop of Baltimore, in October 1895.

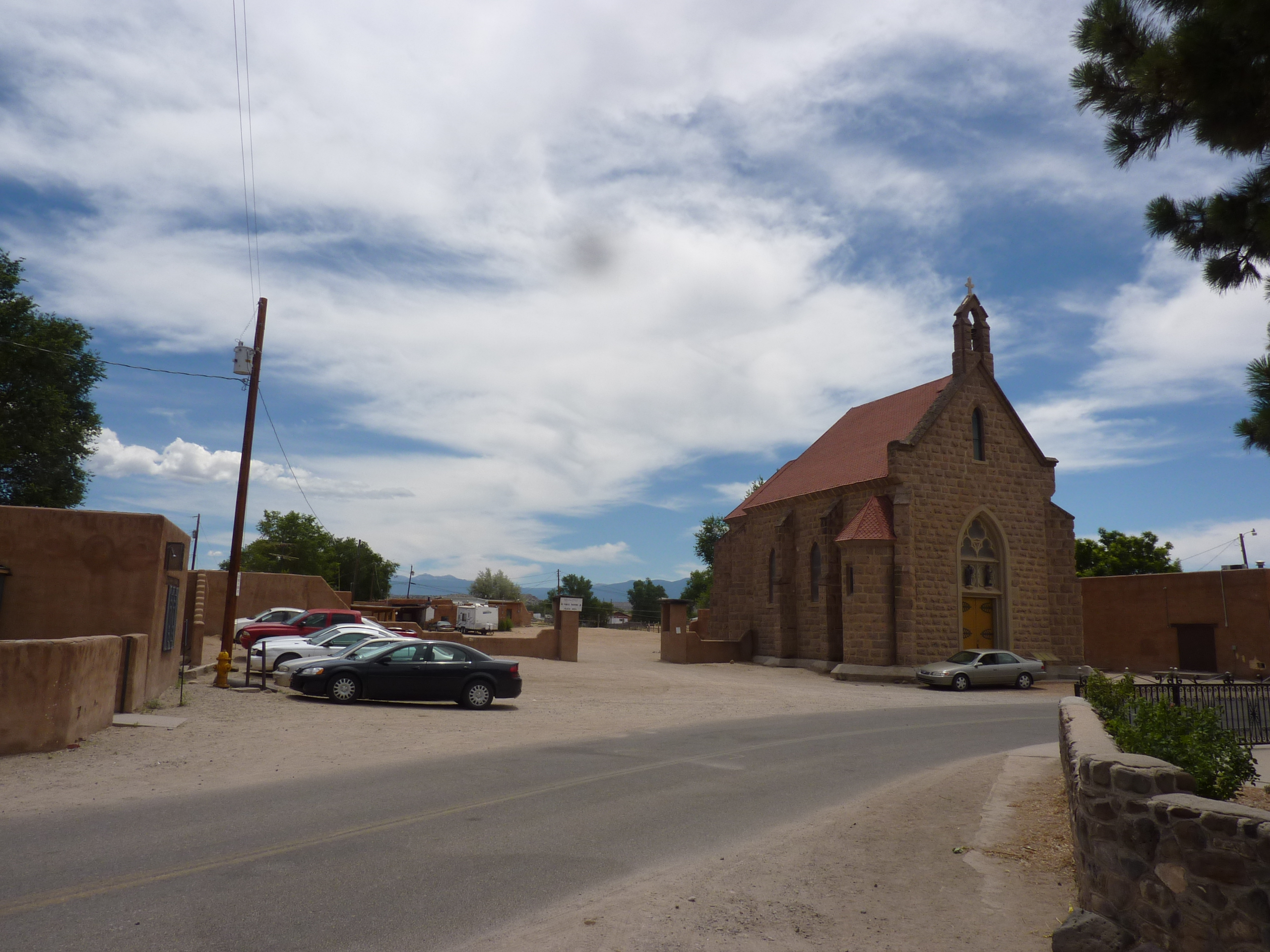
Shrine to Our Lady of Lourdes in 2010.

Fr. Seux's renovation and building campaign, according to historian Marc Treib, was part of an intentional effort on the part of Santa Fe's French clergy to "raise the educational and aesthetic standards of the parishes." In San Juan Bautista and other parishes, the French clergy wished to exchange "the look of the 'primitive' church for that of a 'contemporary' (i.e., 'polite') institution." Fr. Seux's efforts brought a strong French cultural influence to the parish. Indeed, the Shrine to Our Lady of Lourdes is based architecturally off of Sainte-Chapelle in Paris. Fr. Seux's efforts would culminate in the construction of a new church for the parish. In 1912, with the approval of his bishop, he demolished the old adobe church. Construction began on a new brick neo-Gothic church, which was completed in 1913. In 1922 Fr. Seux died, and he was buried beneath the Our Lady of Lourdes shrine.

For a period after its construction, the new church was apparently dedicated as the Church of Our Lady of Lourdes; however, it has since returned to the name Church of San Juan Bautista. In 1974, San Juan Pueblo (Ohkay Owingeh) was listed on the National Register of Historic Places as a historic district, with the church and chapel as contributing properties. The Shrine of Our Lady of Lourdes was restored in 2004. In 2005, San Juan Pueblo returned to its native name of Ohkay Owingeh. The parish celebrated its 415th anniversary in 2013. In 2020, during the COVID-19 pandemic, the parish livestreamed some of its Masses and services on YouTube.

== Missions ==
San Juan Bautista oversees ten mission churches. Three of these are in Native American communities and are known as the Tewa Missions. These are the Church of San Ildefonso at San Ildefonso Pueblo, New Mexico, the Church of San Diego at Tesuque Pueblo, New Mexico, and the Church of Santa Clara at Santa Clara Pueblo, New Mexico. The other seven are in predominantly Hispanic communities. These are Sagrada Familia Mission Church at Los Luceros, New Mexico, Saint Anne Mission Church and San Antonio Mission Church at Alcalde, New Mexico, San Francisco Mission Church at Estaca, New Mexico, San Miguel Mission Church at Ranchitos, New Mexico, San Pablo Mission Church at Chamita, New Mexico, and San Raphael Mission Church at El Guique, New Mexico.
