= White Water, Oklahoma =

Unincorporated community in Oklahoma, US

- Census-designated place
- Location within the state of Oklahoma
- Coordinates: 36°30′06″N 94°43′44″W
- Country: United States
- State: Oklahoma
- County: Delaware

Area
  - Total: 1.20 sq mi (3.11 km^{2})
  - Land: 1.20 sq mi (3.11 km^{2})
  - Water: 0 sq mi (0.00 km^{2})
- Elevation: 1,027 ft (313 m)

Population (2020)
  - Total: 79
  - Density: 66/sq mi (25.4/km^{2})
- Time zone: UTC-6 (Central (CST))
  - Summer (DST): UTC-5 (CDT)
- FIPS code: 40-80912
- GNIS feature ID: 2584397

White Water is a census-designated place (CDP) in Delaware County, Oklahoma, United States. As of the 2020 census, White Water had a population of 79.

== Geography ==
White Water is located in northeastern Delaware County, to the north of Whitewater Creek, a northwest-flowing tributary of the Neosho River. The community is 10 miles (16 km) northeast of Jay, the county seat.

According to the United States Census Bureau, the White Water CDP has a total area of 1.2 square miles (3.1 km^{2}), all land.

== Demographics ==
Historical population
Census	Pop.	Note	%±
2020	79		—
U.S. Decennial Census

=== 2020 census ===
As of the 2020 census, White Water had a population of 79. The median age was 46.5 years. 17.7% of residents were under the age of 18 and 11.4% of residents were 65 years of age or older. For every 100 females there were 102.6 males, and for every 100 females age 18 and over there were 103.1 males age 18 and over.

0.0% of residents lived in urban areas, while 100.0% lived in rural areas.

There were 36 households in White Water, of which 22.2% had children under the age of 18 living in them. Of all households, 75.0% were married-couple households, 2.8% were households with a male householder and no spouse or partner present, and 22.2% were households with a female householder and no spouse or partner present. About 5.6% of all households were made up of individuals and 2.8% had someone living alone who was 65 years of age or older.

There were 44 housing units, of which 18.2% were vacant. The homeowner vacancy rate was 0.0% and the rental vacancy rate was 0.0%.

Racial composition as of the 2020 census
Race	Number	Percent
White	43	54.4%
Black or African American	0	0.0%
American Indian and Alaska Native	11	13.9%
Asian	1	1.3%
Native Hawaiian and Other Pacific Islander	0	0.0%
Some other race	3	3.8%
Two or more races	21	26.6%
Hispanic or Latino (of any race)	7	8.9%
