= Ohkay Owingeh Airport =

- IATA: ESO; ICAO: none; FAA LID: E14

Summary
- Airport type: Public
- Owner: Ohkay Owingeh Tribal Council
- Serves: Española, New Mexico
- Elevation AMSL: 5,790 ft / 1,765 m
- Coordinates: 36°01′34″N 106°02′43″W
- Interactive map of Ohkay Owingeh Airport

Runways
| Direction | Length | | Surface |
| Direction | ft | m | Surface |
|---|---|---|---|
| 16/34 | 5,007 | 1,526 | Asphalt |

Statistics (2022)
- Aircraft operations (year ending 4/25/2022): 5,200
- Source: Federal Aviation Administration

Ohkay Owingeh Airport (IATA: ESO, FAA LID: E14, formerly Q14) is a public use airport located in Rio Arriba County, New Mexico, United States. It is three nautical miles (6 km) northeast of the central business district of the city of Española. The airport is owned by the Ohkay Owingeh Tribal Council.

The airport was known as the San Juan Pueblo Airport until 2008. The name change occurred due to the San Juan Pueblo returning to its pre-Spanish name in November 2005. The Tewa name Ohkay Owingeh means "place of the strong people".

The airport briefly saw commercial airline service in 1978 when Trans Western Airlines of Utah added Espanola as a stop along a route between Albuquerque and Denver. Other stops were also made at Santa Fe, Taos, and Alamosa.

== Facilities and aircraft ==
The airport covers an area of 236 acres (96 ha) at an elevation of 5,790 feet (1,765 m) above mean sea level. It has one runways: 16/34 is 5,007 by 75 feet (1,526 x 23 m) with an asphalt pavement. Runway 6/24 is permanently closed and a fence has been built across it.

For the 12-month period ending April 25, 2022, the airport had 5,200 aircraft operations, an average of 100 per week, 96% general aviation and 4% military.
