= G. E. E. Lindquist Native American photograph collection =

The G. E. E. Lindquist Native American photograph collection is an online presentation of the 1322 photographs, 124 postcards, 388 negatives, and 34 glass plate negatives/lantern slides, which derive from the Gustavus Elmer Emanuel Lindquist Papers archival collection at the Burke Library at Union Theological Seminary, Columbia University in the City of New York.

They depict the people, places, and practices of Native Americans and their communities from at least 34 States, plus Canada and Mexico in the period from 1909-1953. The majority of the images were taken by Gustavus E.E. Lindquist (1886-1967), an itinerant representative of the ecumenical Home Missions Council of the Federal Council of Churches.

== About the collection ==
Sourced from Lindquist's archival papers, the Lindquist online image collection depicts the people, places, and practices of Native American communities from the U.S., Canada, and Mexico. These photographs were taken by Lindquist, an ordained home missions administrator, as he traveled to reservations from 1909 to 1953 as part of his work with the Home Mission Council of the Federal Council of Churches.

Online access is now available to the collection, which includes 1322 photographs, 124 postcards, 388 negatives, and 34 glass plate negatives/lantern slides.

This collection consists of individual and group portraits, landscapes, buildings, agricultural and industrial scenes, cemeteries, parades and pageants, leisure activities, weather events, modes of transportation, and living conditions across a variety of Native communities.

The photographs will be of considerable research value to scholars and researchers exploring topics in 20th Native American history, anthropology, Christian missions, architecture, photography, and the trans-Mississippi West.

== Finding Aids ==
The primary finding aid is available at the Burke Library website.
