= John Gonzales =

American politician

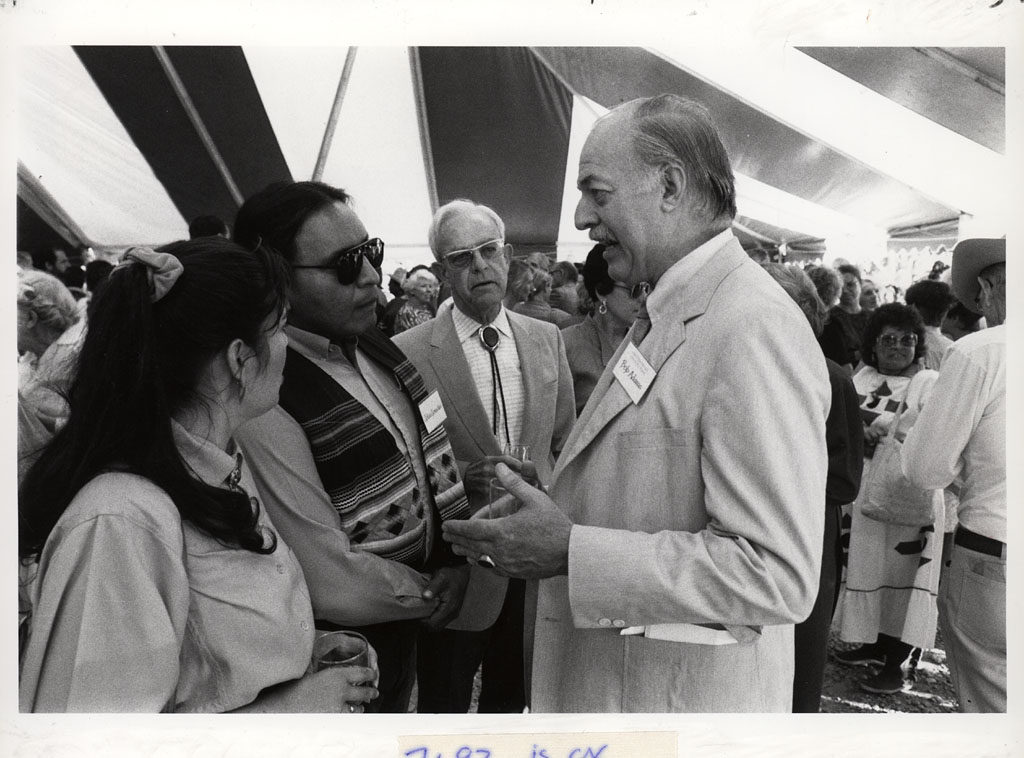
Smithsonian Secretary Robert McCormick Adams and John Gonzales, discuss the National Museum of the American Indian at a reception held at the Wheelwright Museum of the American Indian in Santa Fe, New Mexico, in August 1990.

John Gonzales (born 1955) is a Tewa politician and potter. He is the former President of the National Congress of American Indians, served as a consultant to the first Bush administration, a council member of the Tribal Council of San Ildefonso for eight years, and Governor of San Ildefonso.
