= Ohkay Owingeh, New Mexico =

Pueblo in Rio Arriba County, New Mexico

- Ohkay Owingeh (San Juan Pueblo)
- U.S. National Register of Historic Places
- U.S. Historic district
- NM State Register of Cultural Properties
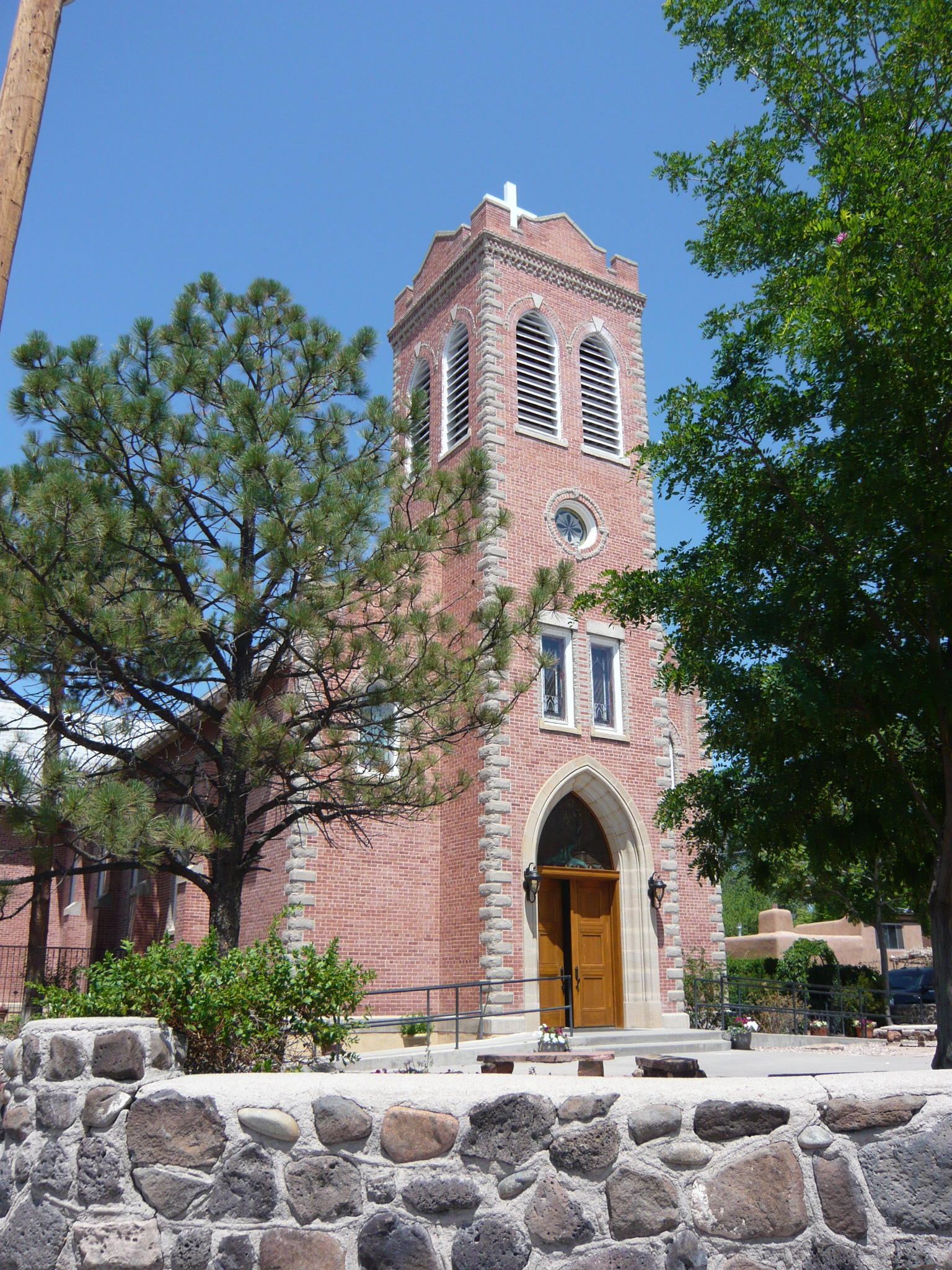
- San Juan Bautista Church

- Location within New Mexico Location within the United States
- Nearest city: Española, New Mexico
- Coordinates: 36°3′15″N 106°4′13″W
- Area: 16.2 acres (6.6 ha)
- Built: 1540
- NRHP reference No.: 74001201
- NMSRCP No.: 254

Significant dates
- Added to NRHP: July 30, 1974
- Designated NMSRCP: July 28, 1972

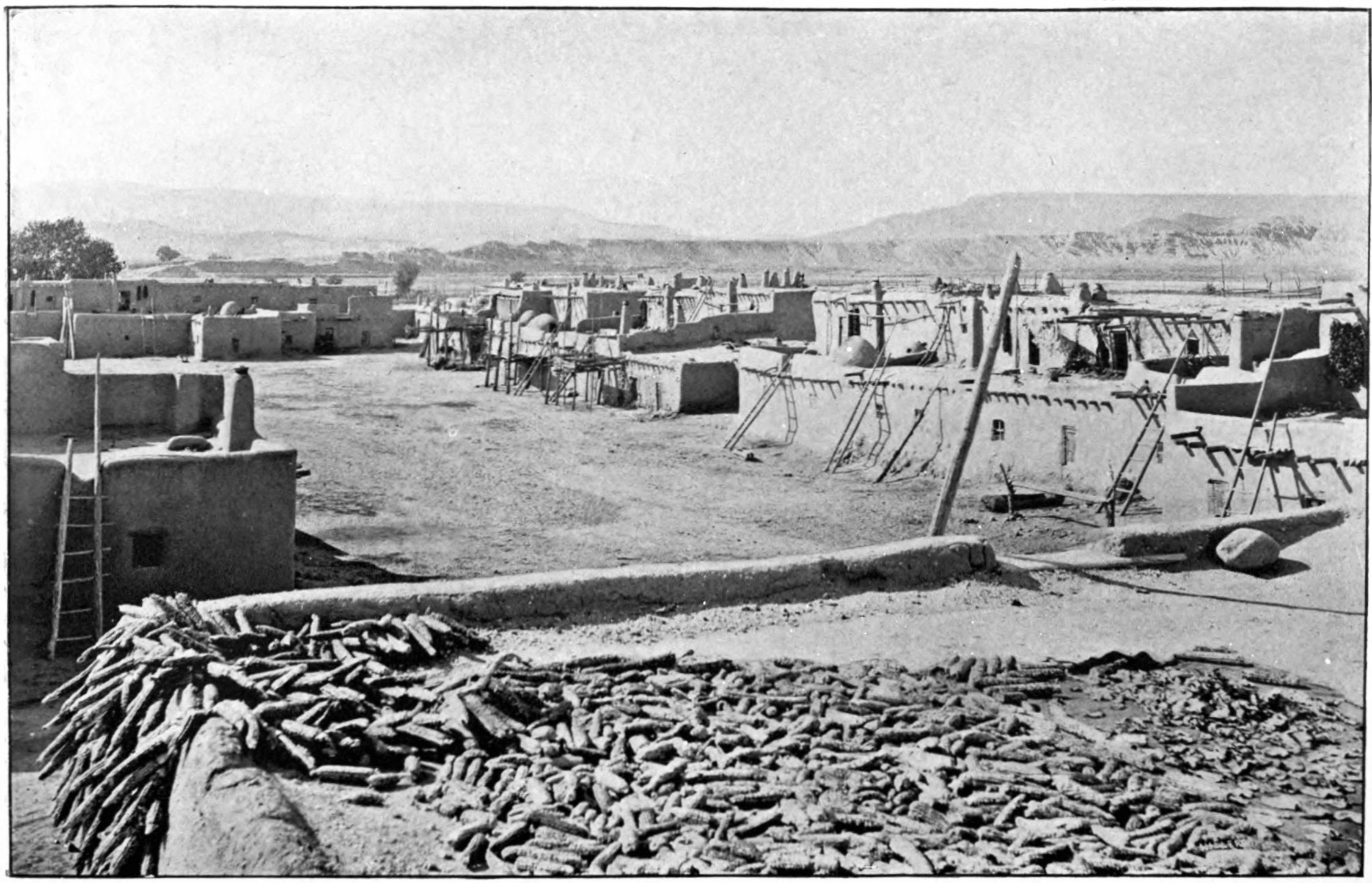
Ohkay Owingeh Pueblo in 1896

Ohkay Owingeh (Note: /ˈoʊkeɪ oʊˈwɪŋɡeɪ/ OH-kay oh-WING-gay) (Tewa: Ohkay Ówîngeh, pronounced [ʔòhkèː ʔówîŋɡè]), known by its Spanish name as San Juan de los Caballeros, or informally as San Juan Pueblo, a name with official status from 1598 to 2005, is a Tewa pueblo in Rio Arriba County, New Mexico. For statistical purposes, the United States Census Bureau has defined that community as a census-designated place (CDP). Ohkay Owingeh is also the federally recognized tribe of Pueblo people inhabiting the town.

== Name ==
Ohkay Owingeh was known for centuries as San Juan Pueblo, as it was named by Spanish colonists. In November 2005, the people returned to their original name. The Tewa name of the pueblo means "place of the Strong People".

Ohkay Owingeh has the ZIP code 87566. The U.S. Postal Service prefers that name for addressing mail, but accepts the alternative name San Juan Pueblo.

The community was also formally known as the San Juan Indian Reservation.

== Geography ==
Its elevation is 5,663 feet (1,726 m) and it is located at 36°03′12″N 106°04′08″W. One of its boundaries is contiguous with Española (Tewa: Búuˀtsʼąąbiˀiweh), about 25 miles (40 km) north of Santa Fe.

== Government ==
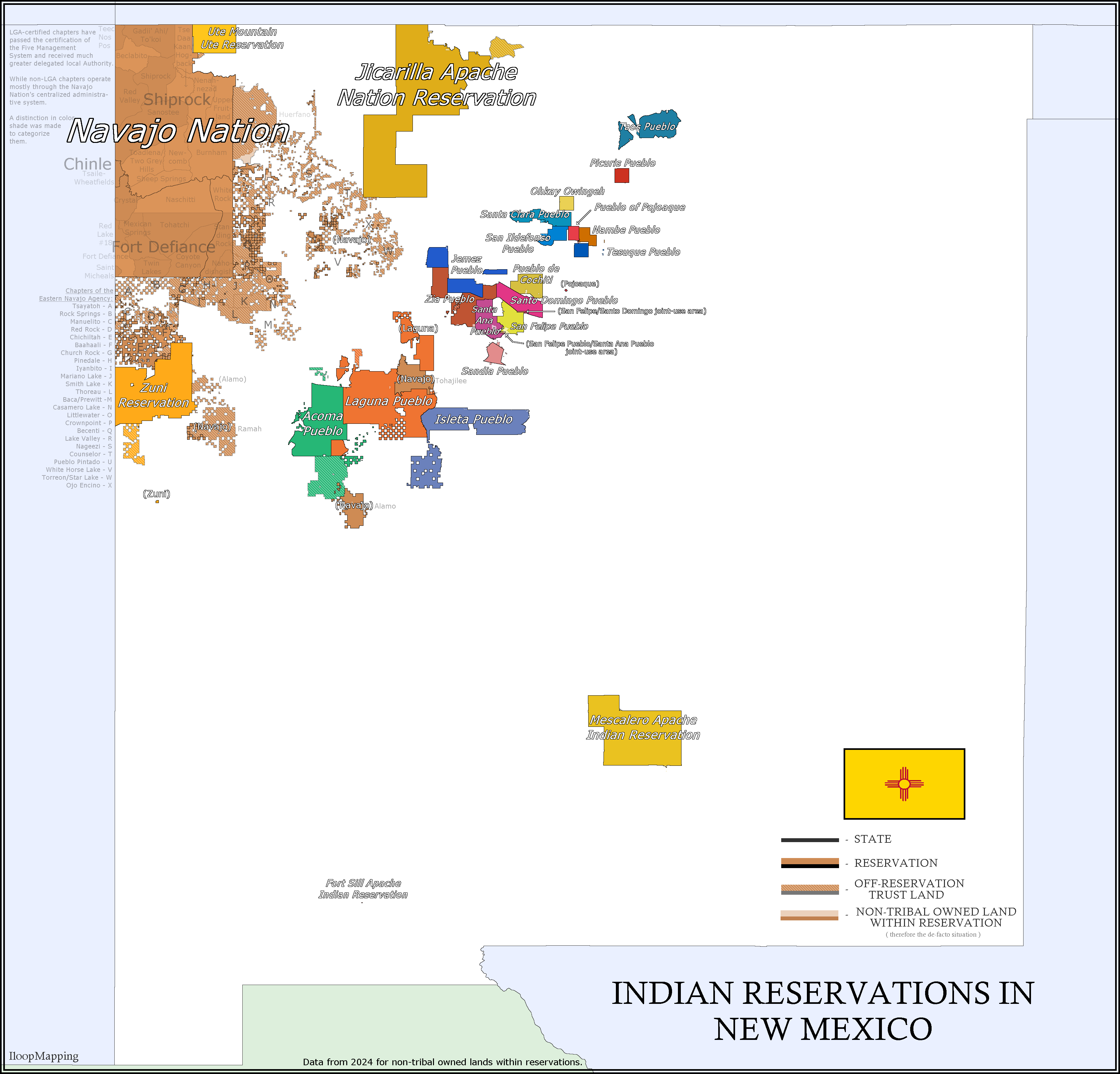
Map of the Ohkay Owingeh and neighbouring tribes (In pale yellow).

The administration of the Ohkay Owingeh in 2025 is:

- Governor: Ben Lujan
- First Lieutenant Governor: Matthew Martinez
- Second Lieutenant Governor: Frank Aguino

== History ==
The pueblo was founded around 1200 AD during the Pueblo III Era. By tradition, the Tewa people moved here from the north, perhaps from the San Luis Valley of southern Colorado, part of a great migration extending into the Pueblo IV Era.

=== Spanish colonial capital ===
In March 1598, conquistador Oñate traveled north from Nueva Galicia accompanied by a caravan of Catholic missionaries, a thousand soldiers, colonists, and Tlaxcalans. The expedition included cattle, sheep, goats, oxen, and horses, and arrived at Yúngéh (place of the mockingbird) in present-day Ohkay Owingeh on July 11, 1598.

It was recorded that the people who met him that day were hospitable and offered Yuque Yunque pueblo as guest quarters to Oñate and his party. On July 12, 1598, he baptized and renamed Caypa pueblo (present-day Ohkay Owingeh) as San Juan de los Caballeros, after his patron saint John the Baptist. San Juan de los Caballeros became the first capital of the New Spanish region of Santa Fe de Nuevo Méjico.

In local history, it is said the event united the two fragmented families of Caypa and Yuque Yunque. Since their arrival from earlier homelands in the northwest, the two pueblos had been divided by the river, split until the expedition party's arrival. When the community offered Yuque Yunque pueblo on the west bank to Oñate, the two fragmented pueblos were made whole again at Caypa. The Spanish capital would be moved in 1610 to La Villa Real de la Santa Fe de San Francisco de Asís.

=== Modern era ===
Ohkay Owingeh is the headquarters of the Eight Northern Indian Pueblos Council. The pueblo people are from the Tewa ethnic group of American Indians. It is one of the largest Tewa-speaking pueblos.

The annual Pueblo Feast Day is June 24. For all pueblos, the actual feast day includes a Catholic mass that is held in the morning. Because of historical relations with the Catholic Church, all pueblos have a church located near the center of the village. Most Pueblo people practice aspects of both the Catholic religion and Pueblo belief systems. The tribe owns the Ohkay Casino and the Oke-Oweenge Crafts Cooperative, which showcases redware pottery, weaving, painting, and other artwork from the eight northern pueblos.

== Demographics ==
As of 2017, 1,480 people were estimated to be living in the CDP, with 6,690 in the surrounding Census County Division. The 2010 census found that 1,522 people in the U.S. described themselves as exclusively Ohkay Owingeh and 1,770 as Ohkay Owingeh exclusively or in combination with another group.

== Education ==
It is in the Española Public Schools district. The comprehensive public high school is Española Valley High School.

== Notable natives ==
- Emiliano Abeyta, painter
- Juan B. Aquino, painter
- Robert Aquino, painter
- Lorencita Atencio, painter and textile artist
- Joe A. Garcia, tribal governor (1995–2006) and head councilman (2009–2023)
- Rose Gonzales, potter
- Evelina Zuni Lucero, writer
- Esther Martinez, linguist and storyteller
- Po'pay, Tewa leader of the Pueblo Revolt of 1680
- Alfonso Ortiz, professor and cultural anthropologist
- Leonidas Tapia, potter

== See also ==
- National Register of Historic Places listings in Rio Arriba County, New Mexico
- Ohkay Owingeh Airport
