= Adekagagwaa =

Haudenosaunee sun deity

Adekagagwaa (Note: Onondaga: Ędekháʼ Gáähgwa·ʼ; Cayuga: Ędehká:ˀ Gá:gwa:ˀ; Seneca: Ëde:kha: Gä́:hgwa:ʼ) is a Haudenosaunee sun deity. He is also associated with summer.

Adekagagwaa was said to have control over several weather gods, including Gǎ-oh, the wind god, Hé-no, the god of thunder and storm, and Gohone, the god of winter. Every winter, Adekagagwaa would leave for the southern skies, leaving his "sleep spirit" to keep watch. As he left, he would promise his return, when once again he would reign over the weather gods. On his return, Gohone would depart the land.
