= Names of the Haudenosaunee =

Etymological analysis of the name "Haudenosaunee"

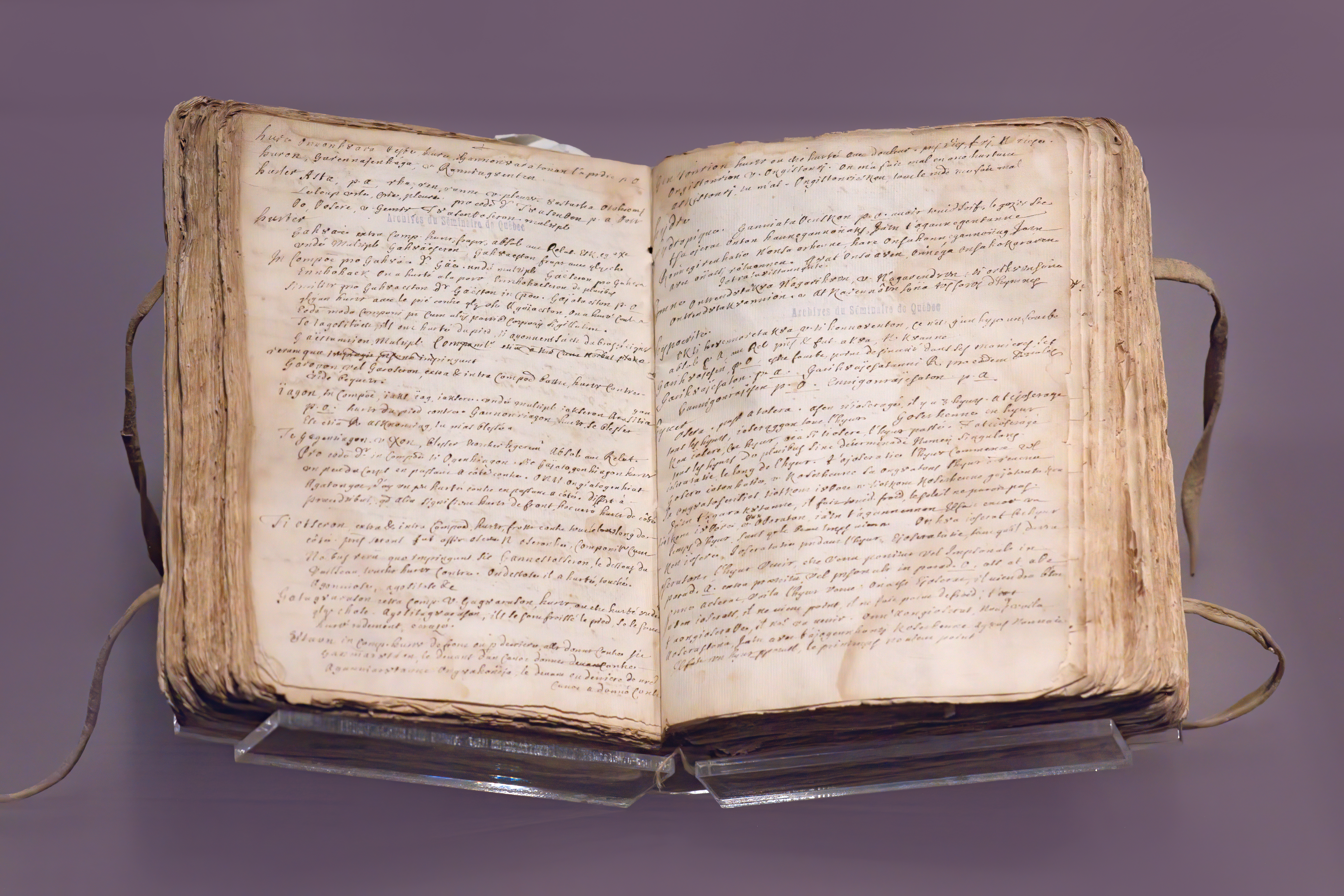
Iroquois dictionary, Jesuit fathers, Quebec, c. 1660

Haudenosaunee (People of the Longhouse) (Note: Mohawk: Rotinonhsón꞉ni, IPA: [rodinũhˈsṹːni] or Rotinonhsyòn:ni, IPA: [rodinũhˈʃũ̀ːni]; Oneida: Lotinuhsyu·niʼ, IPA: [lodinũhʃũːniʔ] or Lotinosho꞉ni, IPA: [lodinoshoːni]; Onondaga: Ganųhcyų́·nih or Ganoñhshyoñ·nih, IPA: [ganũhˈʃjṹːnih]; Cayuga: Hodinǫ̱hsǫ́꞉nih, IPA: [hodin̥õ̥hˈsṍːnih]; Seneca: Hodínöhšö꞉ni꞉h, IPA: [hodínɔ̃hˈʃɔ̃ːniːh]; Tuscarora: Akunęhsyę̀·niˀ, IPA: [agunə̃hʃə̃ːniʔ]) is the autonym by which the Six Nations refer to themselves. Iroquois, a common historical name, is a term of colonial origin which some scholars consider a derogatory name adopted from the traditional enemies of the Haudenosaunee.

== Haudenosaunee ==
Haudenosaunee (/ˌhoʊdɪnoʊˈʃoʊni/ HOH-din-oh-SHOH-nee; lit. 'those who build the longhouse'), is an anglicized spelling derived from two phonetically similar but etymologically distinct words in the Seneca language: Hodínöhšö꞉ni꞉h, meaning "those of the extended house", and Hodínöhsö꞉ni꞉h, meaning "house builders". The name "Haudenosaunee" first appears in English in Lewis Henry Morgan's work (1851), where he writes it as Ho-dé-no-sau-nee. The spelling "Hotinnonsionni" is also attested from later in the 19th century. An alternative designation, Ganonsyoni, is occasionally encountered as well, from the Mohawk kanǫhsyǫ́·ni "the extended house", or from a cognate expression in a related Iroquoian language; in earlier sources it is variously spelled "Kanosoni", "akwanoschioni", "Aquanuschioni", "Cannassoone", "Canossoone", "Ke-nunctioni", or "Konossioni".

The Haudenosaunee use the traditional longhouse as a symbol of their Confederacy. Each nation is assigned a symbolic role within this structure, with the eastern and westernmost nations, the Mohawk and Seneca, serving as Keepers of the Eastern and Western Door respectively and the centrally-located Onondaga serving as the Keepers of the Fire. In keeping with the imagery of a family under one roof, the Mohawk, Seneca, and Onondaga are recognized as Elder Brothers in the Grand Council, while the Cayuga and Oneida are the Younger Brothers.

== Six Nations ==
The Haudenosaunee have also been called the Six Nations, (Note: Mohawk: Iáia’k Nihononhontsá꞉ke; Onondaga: áhyaˀk nihonųhwęjyagéh; Cayuga: Hyeí Niyǫhwęjá꞉ge꞉; Seneca: Ye꞉i’ Níónöëdzage꞉h) (Note: This is frequently used on the official Haudenosaunee Confederacy website.) after the constituent nations of the Mohawk, Oneida, Onondaga, Cayuga, Seneca, and Tuscarora. Prior to the entry of the Tuscarora into the confederacy in 1622, they were known as the Five Nations. (Note: Mohawk: Wísk Nihononhontsá꞉ke; Onondaga: hwiks nihonųhwęjyagéh; Cayuga: Hwíhs Niyǫhwęjá꞉ge꞉; Seneca: Wís Níónöëdzage꞉h)

== Ongweh’onweh ==
A less common, older autonym for the people of the confederation is Ongweh’onweh, (Note: Mohawk: Onkwehón꞉we; Oneida: ukwehu·wé; Onondaga: ųgwehų́·weh or Oñgwehoñwe’; Cayuga: Ǫgwehǫ́꞉weh; Seneca: ögwé’ö꞉weh; Tuscarora: ękwehę̀·we) meaning "Original People" or "Real Human Being". At its most expansive, this name can refer to all indigenous people of the Americas.

== Iroquois ==
The origins of the name Iroquois (/ˈɪrəkwɔɪ, -kwɑː/ IRR-ə-kwoy, -kwah) are somewhat obscure, although the term has historically been used in French texts, according to the Haudenosaunee Conferedacy. Its first written appearance as "Irocois" is in Samuel de Champlain's account of his journey to Tadoussac in 1603. Other early French spellings include "Erocoise", "Hiroquois", "Hyroquoise", "Irecoies", "Iriquois", "Iroquaes", "Irroquois", and "Yroquois", pronounced at the time as [irokwe] or [irokwɛ]. (Note: [e] pronunciation according to Goddard (1978). [ɛ] pronunciation according to Day (1968).) Competing theories have been proposed for this term's origin, but none has gained widespread acceptance. In 1978 Ives Goddard wrote: "No such form is attested in any Indian language as a name for any Iroquoian group, and the ultimate origin and meaning of the name are unknown."

Jesuit priest and missionary Pierre François Xavier de Charlevoix wrote in 1744:

The name Iroquois is purely French, and is formed from the [Iroquoian-language] term Hiro or Hero, which means I have said—with which these Indians close all their addresses, as the Latins did of old with their dixi—and of Koué, which is a cry sometimes of sadness, when it is prolonged, and sometimes of joy, when it is pronounced shorter.

In 1883, Horatio Hale wrote that Charlevoix's etymology was dubious. Hale suggested instead that the term came from Huron, and was cognate with the Mohawk ierokwa "they who smoke", or Cayuga iakwai "a bear". In 1888, J. N. B. Hewitt expressed doubts that either of those words existed in the respective languages. He preferred the etymology from Innu-aimun (Montagnais) irin "true, real" and ako "snake", plus the French -ois suffix. Later he revised this to Algonquin Iriⁿakhoiw as the origin.

A more modern etymology was advocated by Gordon M. Day in 1968, elaborating upon Charles Arnaud from 1880. Arnaud had claimed that the word came from Innu irnokué, meaning "terrible man", via the reduced form irokue. Day proposed a hypothetical Innu phrase irno kwédač, meaning "a man, an Iroquois", as the origin of this term. For the first element irno, Day cites cognates from other attested Innu dialects: irinou, iriniȣ, and ilnu; and for the second element kwédač, he suggests a relation to kouetakiou, kȣetat-chiȣin, and goéṭètjg – names used by neighboring Algonquian peoples to refer to the Haudenosaunee, Wendat (Huron), and Laurentian peoples.

The Gale Encyclopedia of Multicultural America attests the origin of Iroquois to Iroqu, Algonquian for "rattlesnake". The French encountered the Algonquian-speaking tribes first, and would have learned the Algonquian names for their Haudenosaunee competitors.

== Country ==
The Haudenosaunee call their traditional territory Haudenosauneega (Note: Mohawk: Kanonhsonní:keh) (transl. Land of the Longhouse Builders), as well as Land of the Five Nations.

In English, the land governed by the Six Nations has been known as Iroquoia (French: Iroquoisie) and Haudenosauneega.

== See also ==
- List of country-name etymologies
