= Firekeeper =

Ceremonial role

Firekeeper, flametender, flamekeeper, describe a specific ceremonial role, common in the religious practices of a variety of cultures. A firekeeper or flamekeeper tends the sacred fire (or fires) in the manner specific to the religious traditions of that culture.

== Overview ==
In many ancient civilizations the open flame has served as both a central spiritual or religious symbol, as well as played a central role in basic human survival. Similarly, those entrusted with tending this flame often held a sacred role in the culture. This role continues in some traditional cultures into the present day.

A sacred fire is often a place for the offering of prayers, herbs, food, and sacrifices of artwork. An eternal or perpetual flame provides hot coals for the kindling of other fires in the community. A sacred fire is usually kept separate from any cooking fire, and may be placed in or near a ceremonial enclosure.

In the past before matches and easy ways of making fire under wet conditions, it was necessary for someone to always be present to keep the flames or red coals burning for long periods of time.

== Haudenosaunee ==
In the Haudenosaunee Confederacy of northeastern North America, Firekeepers are a specific role within the traditional consensus-based system of government. Traditional Haudenosaunee governance is visualized metaphorically as a single longhouse with chiefs sitting around a central Council Fire. Among the chiefly councils of individual communities, each of the Six Nations, and the Grand Council of the Confederacy, the chiefly representatives are divided along clan or national lines into two moieties, as well as a third group of Firekeepers. While the two moieties present legislation, they must reach consensus before passing the issue to the Firekeepers, who can either approve the consensus or return the issue to the two moieties for further discussion. This process continues until the three groups reach One Mind. At the Haudenosaunee Grand Council, the Onondaga Rotiyanehson (national chiefs) take the role of Firekeepers (Onondaga: honatjisdané·doñʼ).

== See also ==
- Brigid - Irish Goddess and Saint served by women who tend an eternal flame
- Homa (ritual) - Vedic fire sacrifice where offerings are made via a sacred fire
- Hajji Firuz, Zoroastrian firekeeper.
- Parable of the Ten Virgins
- Quest for Fire - fictionalized film of fire keeping
- Vestal Virgin - Roman flametenders
- Wachet auf, ruft uns die Stimme, BWV 140
