= Dinah John =

Native American supercentenarian (c. 1774–1883)

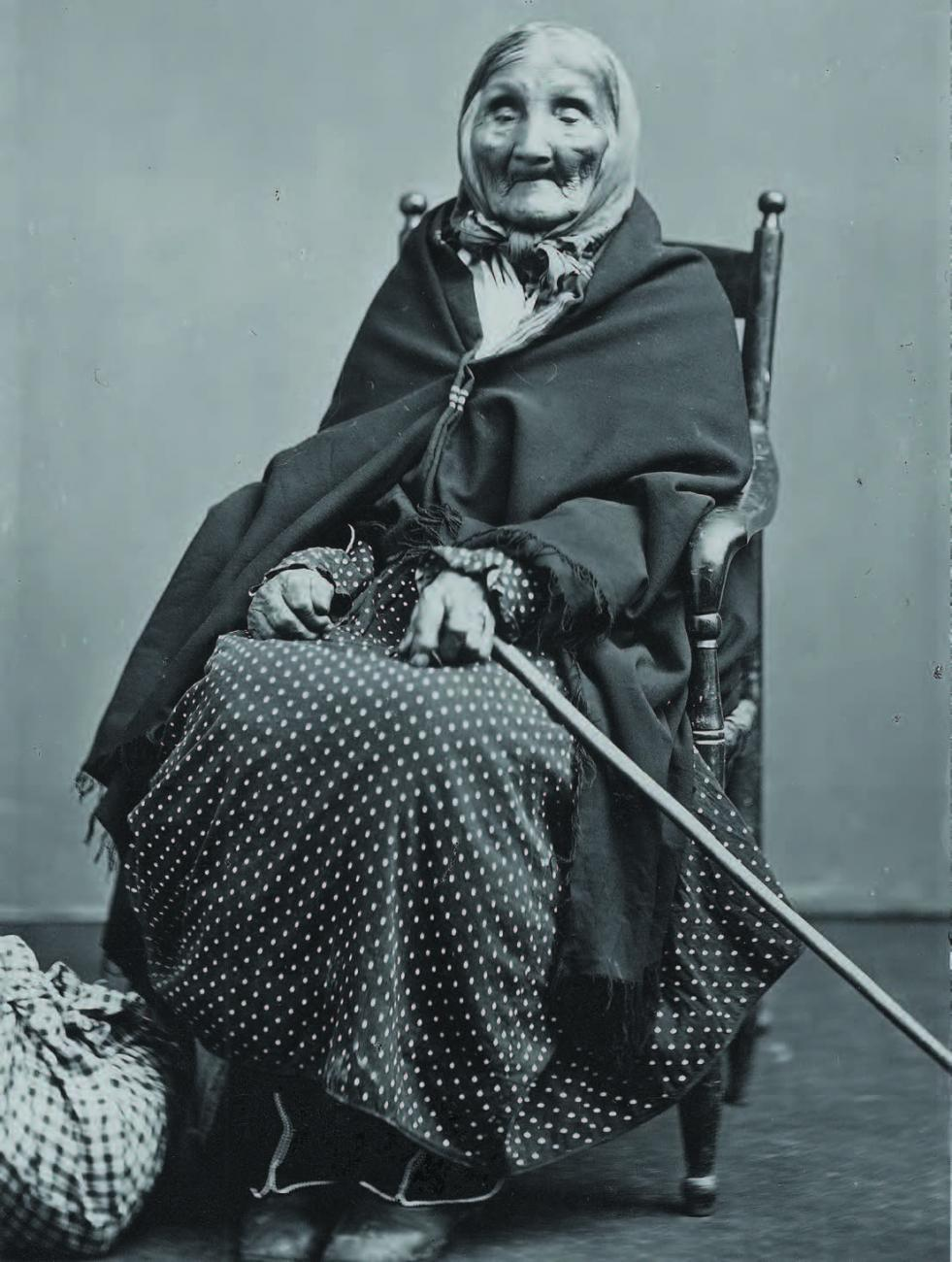
Dinah John in a portrait taken in 1876

Dinah Anthony John, sometimes known as Aunt Dinah and Ta-wah-ta=whe·jah·quah among the Onondaga (Note: Meaning "the earth that upholds itself".) (c. 1774–1883), was a member of the Onondaga tribe in the state of New York, United States. She was known for her longevity and close relationships to both her tribe and European-Americans, and other Americans living in the region. Upon her death in 1883, John was described as having lived to be 107, making her the oldest known Native American at the time.

== Biography ==
It is not known exactly when Dinah Anthony was born. In 1892, Thomas Donaldson wrote that she was 107 years old when she died, while the 19th-century antiquarian William Martin Beauchamp estimated that she was born at the earliest in 1774. Beauchamp argued that she was probably around ten years younger than estimated at her death, but the modern historian Laurence M. Hauptman describes this argument as going against most evidence. In a biographical profile, Beauchamp wrote that Anthony had been alive to see George Washington and was introduced to Horatio Seymour as a baby. Although many of the Onondaga people left central New York after American soldiers killed and burnt their villages, Anthony remained. She lived through a period of growth of the white population in the region. There were just 143 Onondaga on the Onondaga Reservation in 1806, a number that she lived to see grow to around 500 near her death.

Hauptman speculates that Anthony may have been married in the late 18th or early 19th centuries, possibly to a member of the Oneida people. She was living with Thomas John by 1811. During the War of 1812, the Onondaga fought against the British and were allied with the United States. Dina John and her husband served in native regiments, with Dina working as a cook. She was one of at least 14 native women in such a role. A book published by the National Museum of the American Indian writes that "it is plausible that they [Iroquois women] did much more than cook in the 1812 war". Dinah Anthony and Thomas John were reportedly married c. 1816.

Following the war, the couple moved to a house on the reservation, where they farmed the land around them. They had at least two children. John sold items she crafted, such as baskets and pots, to white customers in nearby Syracuse, New York. She walked between the reservation and the city most days until she was over ninety years old. The local white population came to view her very favorably, in part because of her old age and connection to the American Revolution. She was favorably known as Aunt Dinah, by the white population in the region, but remained conscious of her culture, did not pledge allegiance to the United States, and continued to speak the Onondaga language.

Because John's husband had served in the War of 1812, he was eligible for a pension, which under the laws of the time would pass to his wife if he died. Thomas died around April 1857 and four months later Dinah John requested a widow's pension. She hired a white attorney to assist in the application, but the request was denied the following year. Shortly after an 1871 law was passed modifying pensions available to veterans of the war, John again requested a pension and hired another white lawyer for help filing. It was again rejected, in part because she struggled to prove the marriage—no witnesses were alive by 1871. A pension agent was sent to investigate the request and suggested the request be denied.

The photographer Philip S. Ryder took a picture of John in 1876 that saw fairly wide distribution across central New York. A contemporary source reported that she was 100 years old when the photograph was taken. John grew infirm and financially destitute into the 1870s and 1880s and finally received a pension when the 1871 law was modified in 1882. A profile of "famous centenarians" published later that year reported that upon being informed of her pension being granted while she "remained in her widowhood", she laughed and said she was "too old now". She only lived a year longer and died on the native reservation on May 26, 1883. A 5 feet (1.5 m) tall tombstone in her memory was dedicated on July 7 by Syracuse citizens. When she died John was estimated to be 99 to 109 years old. It was commonly reported around the time that she had lived to be 107. A contemporary obituary published on the first page of The Boston Globe reported that she was the oldest Native American when she died, a claim also published in Frank Leslie's Illustrated Newspaper. A journal article published about a decade later described her as having been the oldest on the reservation.

== Assessment ==
Arthur C. Parker estimated that 15 native women from New York played roles in the War of 1812, mostly as cooks. Four were granted pensions for their service as cooks, but John was unable to prove that she had served, although several sources contradict this and list her as one of several Iroquois women to be granted pensions for their service. Her story was included in the 1911 book The Art of Longevity, which attributed her old age in part to a life spent in the open.

The American historian Laurence M. Hauptman wrote that John was "among the most prominent Iroquois women of the nineteenth century in New York". He described her as a "leading Onondaga basketmaker and potter" and wrote that she was one of the first Iroquois women to have their portrait taken. Beauchamp described her as "for many years, one of the best known women in the county".

== Bibliography ==
- Bruce, Dwight Hall (1896). Onondaga's Centennial: Gleanings of a Century. Boston History Company.
- Hauptman, Laurence M. (2006). "The Two Worlds of Aunt Dinah John (1774?–1883), Onondaga Indian". New York History. 87 (1): 4–27. ISSN 0146-437X. JSTOR 23183457.
- Hauptman, Laurence M. (December 1, 1992). The Iroquois in the Civil War: From Battlefield to Reservation. Syracuse University Press. ISBN 978-0-8156-0272-9.
- Harris, Alexandra N.; Hirsch, Mark G. (June 16, 2020). Why We Serve: Native Americans in the United States Armed Forces. National Museum of the American Indian: Smithsonian Institution. ISBN 978-1-58834-697-1.
- Henley, Benjamin James (1911). The Art of Longevity ... Prtd. by the New Werner Company.
- Gear, Kathleen O'Neal (June 15, 1996). Thin Moon and Cold Mist: Women of the West. Macmillan. ISBN 978-0-8125-3657-7.
- "Human Longevity". Buchanan's Journal of Man. 1. J.R. Buchanan. 1887.
- Royal College of Surgeons of England (1885). Famous centenarians : upwards of two hundred instances of persons who have lived to be 100 years old. London : Diprose & Bateman.
