= Gendenwitha =

Mythological character

Gendenwitha (Note: Onondaga: Dwędwęhawíthaʼ; Seneca: Tgëdë́öwi:taʼ) (also spelled Gendewitha) is a mythological character represented by the Morning Star in Haudenosaunee mythology. Her name means "It Brings the Day." Gendenwitha was originally a beautiful woman who was loved by Sosondowah, a great hunter held captive as a guard by Dawn. Dawn transformed Gendenwitha into the Morning Star after Sosondowah attempted to marry her.

== Sosondowah and The Legend of Gendenwitha ==
Sosondowah was a skilled hunter who was captured by Dawn when he pursued a Sky-Elk up into the heavens. Dawn commanded him to spend eternity guarding the door of her lodge in the sky. From his post, Sosondowah caught sight of Gendenwitha as she stood by a river, and fell in love. During Spring, Sosondowah escaped from Dawn while she was sleeping and entered the heart of a bluebird in order to visit his beloved. Gendenwitha, not knowing the true identity of the bluebird, welcomed Sosondowah as a sign of Spring. Sosondowah escaped from Dawn again during Summer, and entered the heart of a blackbird. Again he visited Gendenwitha at the river, and was greeted as a sign of Summer. During Autumn, Sosondowah escaped once more, this time in the body of a giant nighthawk. He swooped down to the river and took Gendenwitha up to the lodge in the sky to marry her. Dawn, angry at the defiance of Sosondowah, transformed Gendenwitha into a star and put her on Sosondowah's forehead so he "must long for her throughout all time without attaining her."

== See also ==
- Haudenosaunee mythology
- Sosondowah
