= Samuel George =

- Hononwirehdonh

Honoñwiyéhdih
- In office 1850 – September 24, 1873

Personal details
- Born: c. 1795 Buffalo Creek Reservation
- Died: September 24, 1873 (aged 77–78)
- Known for: Royaner of the Onondaga people for twenty-three years

See also Sam George

Samuel George (c. 1795 – September 24, 1873) was an Onondaga Royaner, holding the name Hononwirehdonh, or "Great Wolf" (Onondaga: Honoñwiyéhdih) for twenty-three years. He served in the War of 1812 and was a renowned healer and orator among natives and settlers. Modern-day historian Laurence Hauptman describes George as an Iroquoian conservative who supported traditional Haudenosaunee ceremonies, language, and land rights, but also allowed missionaries and schools on the reservation.

== Early life ==
George was born on the Buffalo Creek Reservation into the Wolf Clan of the Onondaga people. His physical appearance is described repeatedly in historical records, which historian Laurence Hauptman summarizes as a "thin, sinewy man with strongly marked features," conveying "athletic prowess and presence". Accounts note that George was well known for his running abilities and was a consistent victor in foot races.

== Service in the War of 1812 ==
George served on the American side during the War of 1812 in defense of the Niagara Frontier for at least three years, and was paid a $120 pension. During the war, George reportedly ran a round trip from American headquarters at Buffalo to the arsenal Canandaigua (a distance of 150 miles) in two days.

Hauptman notes a gap in historical information about George after the War of 1812 until the mid 1840s, when George and his wife and five children moved to Onondaga.

== Years as Royaner ==
In 1850, George became a Royaner, "taking the name Hononwirehdonh, the 'Great Wolf', the hereditary keeper of the wampum held by a member of the Wolf Clan of the Onondaga Nation". In this role, George fought to restore traditional Haudenosaunee government on the Allegany Reservation and Cattaraugus Reservation. At the time, state policies pursued a four-pronged "Americanization" agenda, including missionary activities, state-supported schooling, division of tribal lands to individual Indians, and awarding Indians U. S. citizenship in return for acceptance of the new land ownership arrangements.

George was a renowned orator who used his skill to influence the Haudenosaunee Confederacy. He also frequently spoke at public events, where his speeches were translated into English. He was described by his contemporary, Episcopal minister William Beauchamp as "eloquent" and "full of official dignity" and "fond of storytelling".

During the American Civil War, more than three hundred Haudenosaunee Indians joined the Union. George was the leading spokesman of the Haudenosaunee to Washington at the time. By 1863, he was recognized as the "Principal Chief of the Six Nations" by federal officials, who also awarded him the honorary rank of brevet general. George met with President Abraham Lincoln in November 1863 to discuss Haudenosaunee objections to the Enrollment Act, and convinced him to release Haudenosaunee from duty who had not received the "bounties" owed them. (According to the Act, men who did not want to enroll could pay someone else to enter the service in their place). George continued to negotiate for the discharge of underage Haudenosaunee, as well as object to "conscription of Indians into military service without prior tribal consent," as was specified by historical precedent and treaties.

== Healer ==
George served as a "traditional medicine man" for much of his life and in 1869 was appointed "government physician" to the Onondaga, and was formally licensed to practice medicine. Government official R. H. Gardner stated "I believe Captain George can doctor the Indians as well as a white man. After considerable experience on the subject, I believe that the Indians live under his treatment and are as healthful as when treated by any other physician".

== Death ==
George served as Royaner of the Onondaga until his death on September 24, 1873. Although he never converted to Christianity and was buried according to Haudenosaunee rites, Episcopal leaders delivered a sermon at his funeral.

== Archival Materials ==
- Onondaga Nation Territory Collection, ca. 1845-1900 includes photograph of Sam George, Onondaga Historical Association Research Center, 321 Montgomery Street, Syracuse, NY 13202. Includes photograph of Samuel George (not online).
- Samuel George papers, 1869-1872, Onondaga Historical Association Research Center, 321 Montgomery Street, Syracuse, NY 13202. Includes documents testifying as to his medical licensure and related petition (not online).
