= Gaoh =

Haudenosaunee wind spirit

Gaoh, Ga-oh or Gǎ-oh is a wind spirit and giant of the Haudenosaunee, Wendat and Seneca people.

Gaoh was described as a cannibal and a giant who could uproot trees. He takes the form of a solitary old man. Gaoh is subservient to the Great Spirit, and in Haudenosaunee mythology he is subservient to Adekagagwaa.

Gaoh is mostly a benevolent spirit, but can be restless and violent, and would create storms. Depending on the myths, he either lives in a house in the sky, or a mountain cave called "the House of Winds." From his home, he controls the seasons, and also winds of the four cardinal directions: Ya-o-gah (Nyagwai’) or Bear of the north wind, Da-jo-ji (Dago:ji’) or Panther of the west wind, O-yan-do-ne (Oyëdani’) or Moose of the east wind and Ne-o-gah (Neogë’) or Fawn of the south wind. Some versions of the myths describe the winds as the guardians of Gaoh's home, while others describe the winds being locked up in his home, who were to be released once Gaoh receives the order from the Great Spirit. In the Seneca version of the myth, Gaoh is chained to a rock, and winds would blow when he attempts to break free. Once he is tired and resting, the winds would become quiet.
