= Jogah =

Folkloric spirits in Haudenosaunee lore

Creature information
- Other name(s): Oneida: tehotikalá·luheˀ Cayuga: Jigáhęh Seneca: Dzögä́:ö’ or Dzo’gä́:ö’
- Grouping: Legendary beings
- Sub grouping: Gahongas, Gandayah, Ohdows
- Folklore: Haudenosaunee (Iroquois)

Origin
- Region: Northeastern United States
- Habitat: Forests, streams, subterranean areas

Jogah (Note: Oneida: tehotikalá·luheˀ; Cayuga: Jigáhęh; Seneca: Dzögä́:ö’ or Dzo’gä́:ö’) (Drum Dancers) are the "little people" in Haudenosaunee mythology. Usually invisible, there are ways of telling if they are around. For example, drumming with no visible drummers around. They also leave rings of bare earth and "bowls" in stones or mud; offerings like tobacco and fingernails can be offered at these "bowls." The hollows are said to bring drought-relieving rain when scooped up, dried, and placed in the home. They are also used to explain disembodied lights and bad luck. When people, usually children, elders, and spiritual healers, see the Jogah, they are described as "knee-high" to around 4 ft 0 in (1.22 m) tall.

Behaviorally, the Jogah love games and playing tricks, which can be dangerous if they are disrespected. They have been claimed to cause illness in homes and neighborhoods that are built on sites to which they are attracted. Feather-decorated squirrel pelts are worn as vests and pants by the Jogah.

The Jogah are divided into multiple groups.

- Gahongas "stone throwers or rollers" live in rocky areas like streams. Their favorite game is to play "catch" with people using stones, often the size of boulders. Though small of stature, they are said to be of great strength.
- Gandayah care for the plant life of an area, telling it when to grow and how good its yield will be. They are known to help respectful Haudenosaunee farmers. They are also known to love strawberries and take the forms of American robins, if their news is good, or owls, if it is bad.
- Ohdows are the subterranean guardians of the world. They protect it from creatures of the underworld which would spread disease and, in the case of the "White Buffalo," chaos. The Ohdow come out of the underground at night to dance and hunt any underworld creatures that have escaped. To help with this task, fingernails were left as offerings as the animals knew what Ohdow smelled like and would hide from them.
