= Sketches of the Ancient History of the Six Nations =

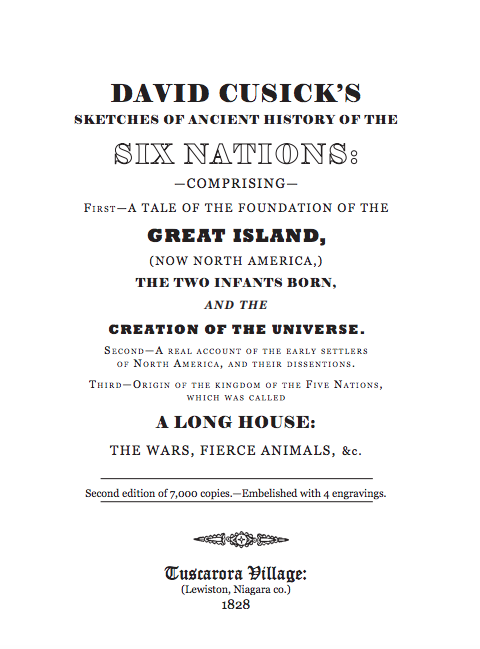
- Author: David Cusick
- Language: English
- Genre: History, fable
- Published: First edition 1826–1827 (Lewiston, New York); 1828 (Lewiston); 1848 (Lockport, New York); 1892 (Fayetteville, New York)
- Publication place: United States

Sketches of the Ancient History of the Six Nations, by the Tuscarora David Cusick, is a mytho-historical narrative about the Haudenosaunee Confederacy of six tribes: the Mohawk, Oneida, Onondaga, Cayuga, Seneca and, later, the Tuscarora. First published between 1826 and 1827, the work has three parts: "A Tale of the Foundation of the Great Island (now North America);" "A Real Account of the Settlement of North America and their Dissentions", and "Origin of the Kingdom of the Five Nations." It was among the earliest English-language attempts to record Native American history from a Native American perspective.

== Background ==
Cusick was the son of Nicholas Cusick, a Tuscarora sachem and interpreter in upstate New York. Born around 1780, David was (like his father) a veteran of America's wars; he fought in the War of 1812 and was, also like his father, a student of Haudenosaunee oral tradition. A physician, painter, and writer, he probably have had some standing in the Tuscarora community; however, little is known about Cusick's life.

Although little is also known about the source of his Sketches, correspondence between the author and historian H. G. Spafford suggests that by late 1825 Cusick did not sell his manuscript, continued the project alone and had it published in Lewiston, New York. Driven to preserve the Haudenosaunee tradition, he reveals in a preface to the 1828 edition that he found himself demoralized and unsuited to the task; "the history [was] involved with fables." He tried again, and produced a pamphlet of sketches: some myth, some fact, some a blend of the two, all intended "to throw some light on the history" (unrecorded) "of the original population of the country."

Notable aspects of Cusick's preface are his admission that there was no consensus about Haudenosaunee history, and any interpretation he made was likely to be contentious; the humility of his tone, and his observation that truth and myth were indistinct. Haudenosaunee fables were so closely bound to its history as to be inseparable, and Sketches begins with a fantastic origin tale.

== Synopsis ==
=== Part One: Creation ===
In the upper world was a woman, bearing twins, who slept one evening and (as if by magic) sank through the earth into the "great deep". She was caught by a giant turtle, on whose shell she climbed toward the surface.

During the ascent, the turtle transformed into an island of earth; the twins (one of whom was possessed "[with] an evil opinion") fought within their mother's womb and the mother, succumbing to her "painful condition," died shortly after giving birth.

The turtle assumed the form of an island, and the twins grew up. One was called Enigonhahetgea ("the bad mind"), and the other Enigorio ("the good mind"). Enigonhahetgea took to the dark; Enigorio took to the light, and set off on the business of creation. He took his deceased mother's head and fashioned an "orb" (the sun), which he laid at the center of the firmament. Enigorio made the moon from her body, and from the earth he sculpted "his own likeness, male and female". Breathing life into them, he conceived the Eagwehowe (Real People) and gave them the Great Island.

As the good mind created, the bad mind undid. They met in combat from which the good mind emerged victorious, ending the age of creation and beginning the age of humankind.

=== Part Two: First Peoples ===
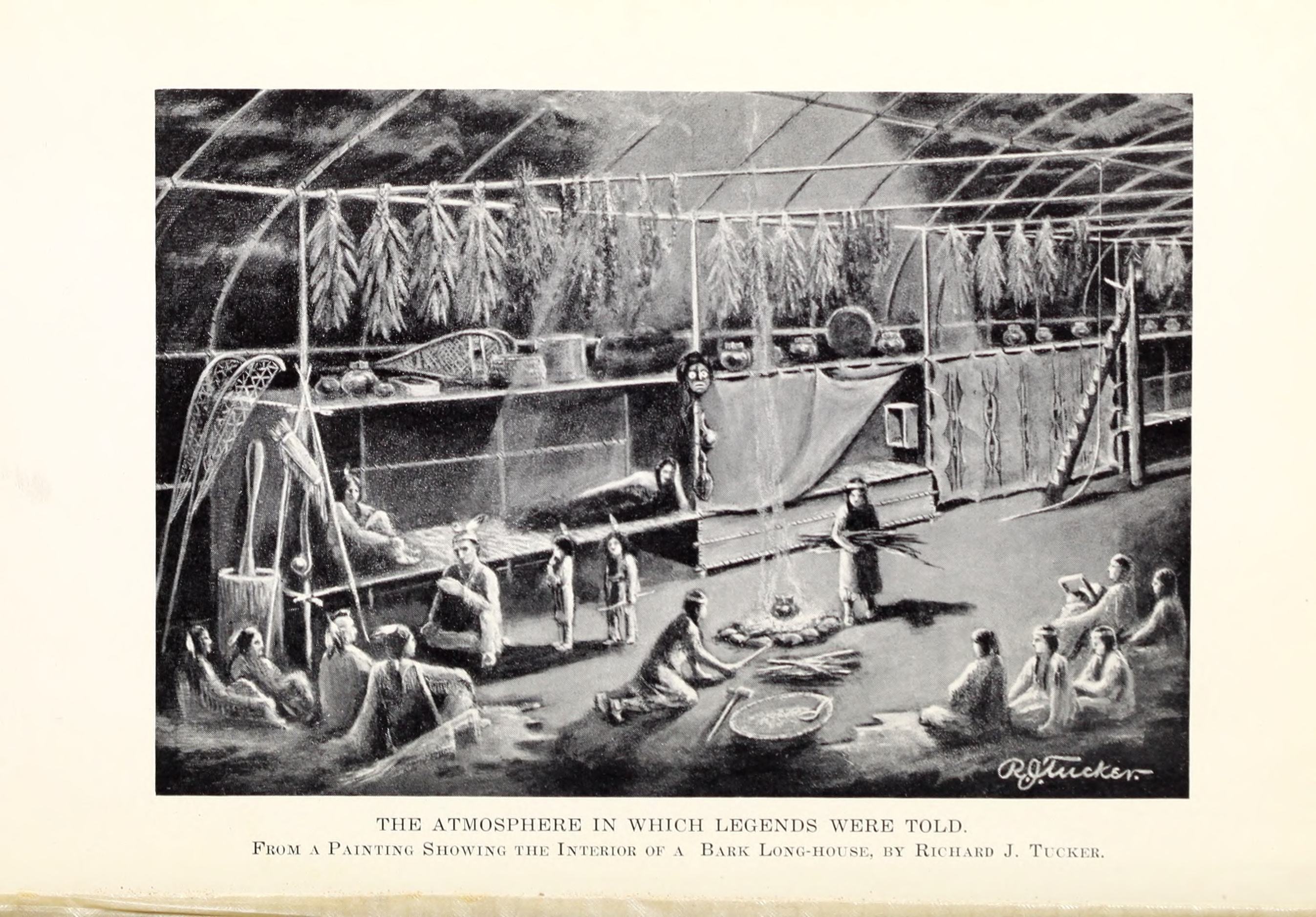
Seneca ho-de-no-sote (longhouse), from a 1923 book

Two millennia before the arrival of Christopher Columbus, the Eagwehowe people of the north settled along the river Kanawage and were besieged by a clan of "giants": the Ronnongwetowanea. According to legend, the giants raided a household consisting of a chieftain, six brothers and a sister; the giant-leader carried the sister off and made her his wife. The oldest brother pursued his sister, but was killed. The youngest brother, Donhtonha, followed his brother's path toward the giants' lair. He killed the king; his sister fled into the woods to die of grief, and was said to have ascended to the heavens and become a northern star.

After a period of conflict between the Ronnongwetowanea and Eagwehoewe peoples, there was a brief peace which ended in a tumult of hostility when the trickster Shotyeronsgwea sowed chaos throughout the land. The Big Quisquiss, a mammoth, brought devastation to settlements south of Lake Ontario. The northern nations became a confederation and declared war on the emperor of the south, beginning a century-long conflict which the north won.

A serpent appeared on Lake Ontario, bringing plague. A blazing star fell from the sky, bringing a fiery death to all in its path. The Great Island had devolved into chaos, and was once more "in possession of fierce animals."

=== Part Three: The Six Nations ===
According to Haudenosaunee legend, the tribes have battled foes from the invading Otneyarheh ("Stonish Giants") to prehistoric creatures such as the Lake Serpent, "Flying Heads" and musqueto and wars with the Odawa, Erian, and Mississauga nations. All appear in Cusick's narrative.

Sketches is a story of pervasive conflict and settlement. Each chapter is prefaced by an allusion to Columbus, whose "discovery" looms large over the narrative. The frame on which the history is threaded stretches north to the Great Lakes and Saint Lawrence River, west to the Mississippi River and Rocky Mountains, and south to a paradise-like "Golden City."

It begins as the Kuskehsawkich people, beckoned by Tarenyawagon ("the Holder of the Heavens") followed the sunrise toward the rivers Yenonanatche and Shaw-nay-taw-ty, along whose banks the Holder directed the Te-haw-re-ho-geh (Mohawk) tribe to settle. The New-haw-teh-tah-go were settled next, near the creek called Kaw-na-taw-te-ruh; then the Seuh-now-kah-tah, atop the Onondaga mountain; the Sho-nea-na-we-to-wah near lake Go-yo-goh; the Te-hoo-nea-nyo-hent at the foot of a mountain near Canandaigua; and the Kau-tan-oh-akau at Cau-ta-noh, near the mouth of the Neuse River.

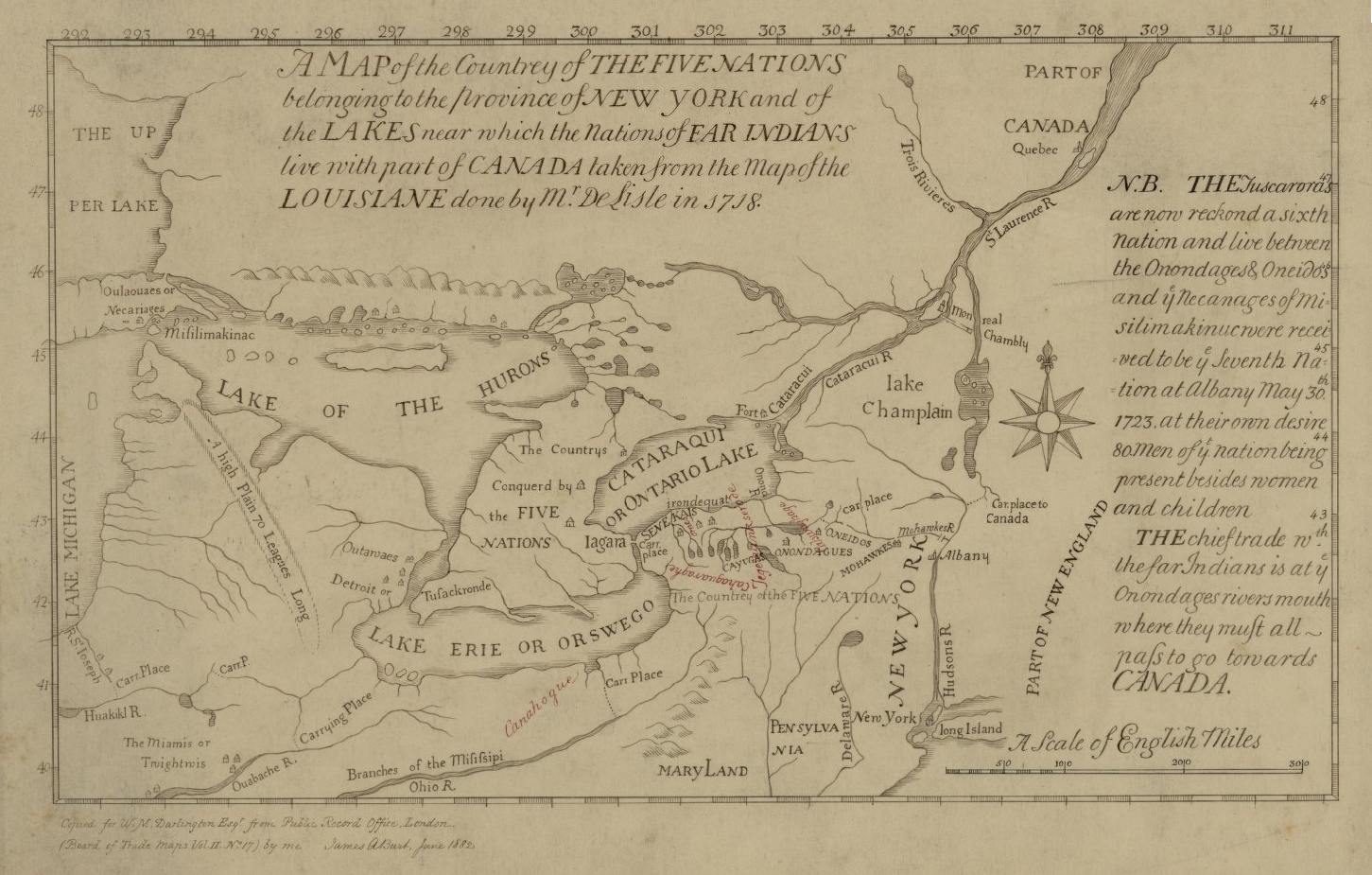
Map of the Five Nations (1730)

Once they all spoke one language, but now their languages were different. The Holder of the Heavens returned and organized them into a confederacy, the Ggo-nea-seab-neh (Long House), composed of the five families: Tea-kaw-reh-ho-geh (Mohawks), New-haw-teh-tah-go (Oneidas), Seuh-nau-ka-ta (Onondagas), Sho-nea-na-we-to-wah (Cayugas) and Te-hoo-nea-nyo-hent (Senecas); later, the Kau-tan-oh-akau (Tuscaroras) joined the confederacy. Another divine agent visited the confederacy, imparting lessons in reason and morality and "seeds for corn, beans, squashes, potatoes, and tobacco."

The Holder of the Heavens departed, leaving the country vulnerable to plundering – first by the Ko-nea-rau-neh-neh (or Flying Heads) and then by the Lake Serpent and the Otne-yar-heh (Stonish Giants), who brought the Long House to heel. Their subjugation ended with the opportune, triumphant return of the Holder of the Heavens.

Some time later, the serpent returned and settled on the main path linking the Five Families. The confederacy sent their best warriors, who slew the monster after a difficult battle. The Holder again descended to advise the ways of war, and the following years were marked by civil strife. The serpent-headed chieftain Atotarho led the hostilities at first, before becoming a lawmaker renowned for restoring the bonds among the Five Families and establishing Onondaga as the political and social heart of the confederacy.

The Senecas (with the help of allies) conquered the Squawkihows, some of whom remained on in the country as vassals. The Oyalkquoher, ("big bear") invaded next, followed by the musqueto.

The Oneidas extended their domain under Atotarho III. About "800 years" before Columbus's arrival, "the Twakanhahorss (now Mississaugers) ceded the colonies lying between the Kea-nau-hau-sent (Oak-Orchard creek) and the Onyakarra (Niagara) river to the Five Nations."

Two stories from this period typify its violence and unpredictability. The first is about Soh-nou-re-wah ("Big Neck"), a child who became a giant and committed atrocities but who was a great hunter. After outstaying his welcome in the community (despite his hunting ability), he built a fort on the Kau-nau-seh-wah-tua-yea river from which he would attack his enemies before he was killed by three warriors near the riverbank. The second concerns a boy near Fort Jenneatowaka who found Kaistowanea, a two-headed serpent which he brought home and which became large and vicious enough to besiege the fort. Kaistowanea ate the entire fort except for one warrior and his sister, who pierced the serpent's heart. Kaistowanea retreated to a nearby lake and died, and the Councilfire – the seat of government – was moved from Jenneatowaka to Thau-gwe-took, west of Geneva Lake.

About 650 years before Columbus's discovery, King Atotarho VII commissioned a western expedition of fifteen men and two captains to "explore the countries toward to the setting sun." The king of Ottauwah sent two of his warriors to join the party. They forded the Mississippi and continued west, contacting the Dog Tail Nation and another unnamed nation; both were friendly. Before reaching the Rocky Mountains, they were blocked by a giant; realizing that their journey was over, they returned to the king and told him about the western lands.

About 200 years later, the Twakanhah (Messissaugers) declared war on the Five Nations and were routed by the Senecas at Fort Kauhanauka; several other skirmishes took place on Ontario lake. The commander at fort Kauhanauka became ambitious and amassed an army of 2,000 warriors to cross the Niagara river and reach the lake, where they were beaten back by the Twakanhah. At a stalemate, the Five Nations and the Twakanhah struck a tentative peace.

Around this time, the Haudenosaunee codified their ethics. Each nation was composed of tribes, and each tribe appointed two chiefs to settle disputes. In a case of murder, for example, the closest relative of the victim executed the murderer with a club. Victim and murderer were laid in the same grave, and aggrieved relatives were sometimes offered restitution. Two adulterous women had their heads shaved, and thieves were brutally whipped.

The Mohawks were "considered an eldest brother" who kept watch "towards the sunrise", and the Senecas kept watch toward the sunset. Representatives met annually at fort Onondaga to legislate. Each nation was "free and independent", with its own jurisdiction and an obligation to aid its fellow nations in times of war. There were a "national committee" and "Chief Ruler," whom the nation vested with the power of a "peace-maker."

The Tuscarora were reportedly visited about 400 years before Columbus's landing by an elderly diviner who told them that "beyond the great water" whites had committed deicide, killing their "Maker," and nothing would stop their march to the Big Island. The man died, then rose from his grave.

The Erian tribe seceded from the Senecas and settled the lands between the Genesee and Niagara Rivers. As they grew in influence, war broke out between them and the Haudenosaunee. The confederacy won the early encounters and, fearing imminent defeat, the Erian queen Yagowanea sued for a favorable peace and they were returned to their country.

The Long House had become numerous and powerful and could assemble an army of "23,000 warriors," adding the Tuscarora to their ranks. At the apparent zenith of their power, however, chaos ensued. Another prophet appeared, "foretell[ing that] the whites would cross the Big Waters and bring strong liquors, and bye up the red people's lands" and exhorting them not to acquiesce "lest they should ruin themselves and displease their Maker."

By the time Columbus discovered America in 1492 (during the reign of Atotarho XIII), the Five Nations were driving the Keatahkiehroneah and Erian tribes out of their country. For a short time, peace prevailed.

== Significance ==
In a variation on the earth-diver myth, Sketches begins with a dualist story of Haudenosaunee origins similar to Zoroastrian or Manichean narratives in which Good and Evil battle. Most of the pamphlet concerns the founding of the Long House, a narrative which asserts the primacy of the Haudenosaunee in Native American history. Cusick paints a portrait of a people unassailable in the face of wave after wave of treacherous, often bestial, enemies. He reminds his American audience, whose independence was described as unique, that "the Long House were free and independent nations, and have been acknowledged in such treaties made with them by neighboring nations."

Because Sketches also bears on the present moment, Cusick emphasizes statecraft and insists on Haudenosaunee solidarity in the present tense: "Every independent nation have a government of their own ... a national committee ... [and] a Chief Ruler." If the Native American character was being besmirched, Cusick intended to correct the perception and portray the Haudenosaunee as a formidable, irrepressible people for whom the United States government was another in a long series of adversaries.

== Reception ==
Unique when published, Sketches was criticized and has been consigned to the margins of history – a footnote in Native American literary anthologies. Contemporary reviews by Henry Rowe Schoolcraft and Francis Parkman were particularly harsh, with Parkman reluctant to write about it at all. Cusick had "produced a small pamphlet in a language almost unintelligible, and filled with a medley of traditions in which a few grains of truth are inextricably mixed with a tangled mass of absurdities."

In more-recent appraisals, historian Barbara A. Mann reproaches Cusick for having grafted Christian interpretations onto Native American theology. Susan Kalter (taking Mann's criticism into account) writes that because of a lack of Native American representation anywhere in modern discourse, Sketches' existence as the first history of its kind makes it a worthy – if flawed – addition to the Native American canon.
