= Lelawala =

In Native American legend, Lelawala was a beautiful Haudenosaunee woman who was venturing in waterfalls one day, but happened to fall out of her canoe. The thunder spirit Hé-no then saved her, as Hé-no was the one who lived behind the falls. At the time, her canoe was broken so Hé-no offered to build a new one. On the day he finished building the canoe, a huge snake with venom so powerful it could kill a whole village, was headed towards the village of Lelawala, but Hé-no then threw a lightning bolt at the snake. The snake landed on top of the falls, creating the curved shape of Horseshoe Falls.

== Adaptations ==
Henry Hadley composed a cantata entitled Lelawala: A Legend of Niagara in 1898, in which Lelawala sacrifices herself to appease the "Thunder Waters" and save her tribe from a famine. Charles Wakefield Cadman's three-act operetta Lelawala: The Maid of Niagara (1926) is based on the story of Lelawala. The libretto includes a number of colonialist plot points, including Lelawala learning about Christian forgiveness from a white missionary.
