= Gohone =

Gohone breaking trees, by Jesse Cornplanter

Gohone is a Haudenosaunee deity associated with winter.

Gohone is a god of winter, who takes the form of an old man with a stick. During winter, he would walk the forests, breaking trees apart with his stick and his powers of frost. Adekagagwaa, the sun god associated with summer, will return at the end of winter and banish Gohone, thus bringing warmth back to the land.
