= Sosondowah =

Haudenosaunee mythic hero

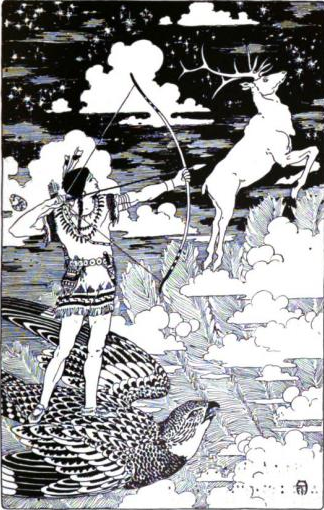
Sosondowah, illustration by Frederick Richardson for The Red Indian Fairy Book (Frances Jenkins Olcott)

The Haudenosaunee mythic hero Sosondowah was a great hunter known for stalking a supernatural elk, Oh-je-a-neh-doh. Sosondowah was captured by Dawn, a goddess who needed him as a watchman. He fell in love with Gendenwitha ("she who brings the day", also spelled Gendewitha), a human woman. He tried to woo her by singing to her in spring as a bluebird, in summer as a blackbird and in autumn as a hawk, who then tried to take Gendenwitha with him to the sky. Dawn tied him to her doorpost and then changed Gendenwitha into the Morning Star, so he could watch her all night but never be with her.

== See also ==
- Haudenosaunee mythology
