= Hé-no =

Haudenosaunee thunder spirit

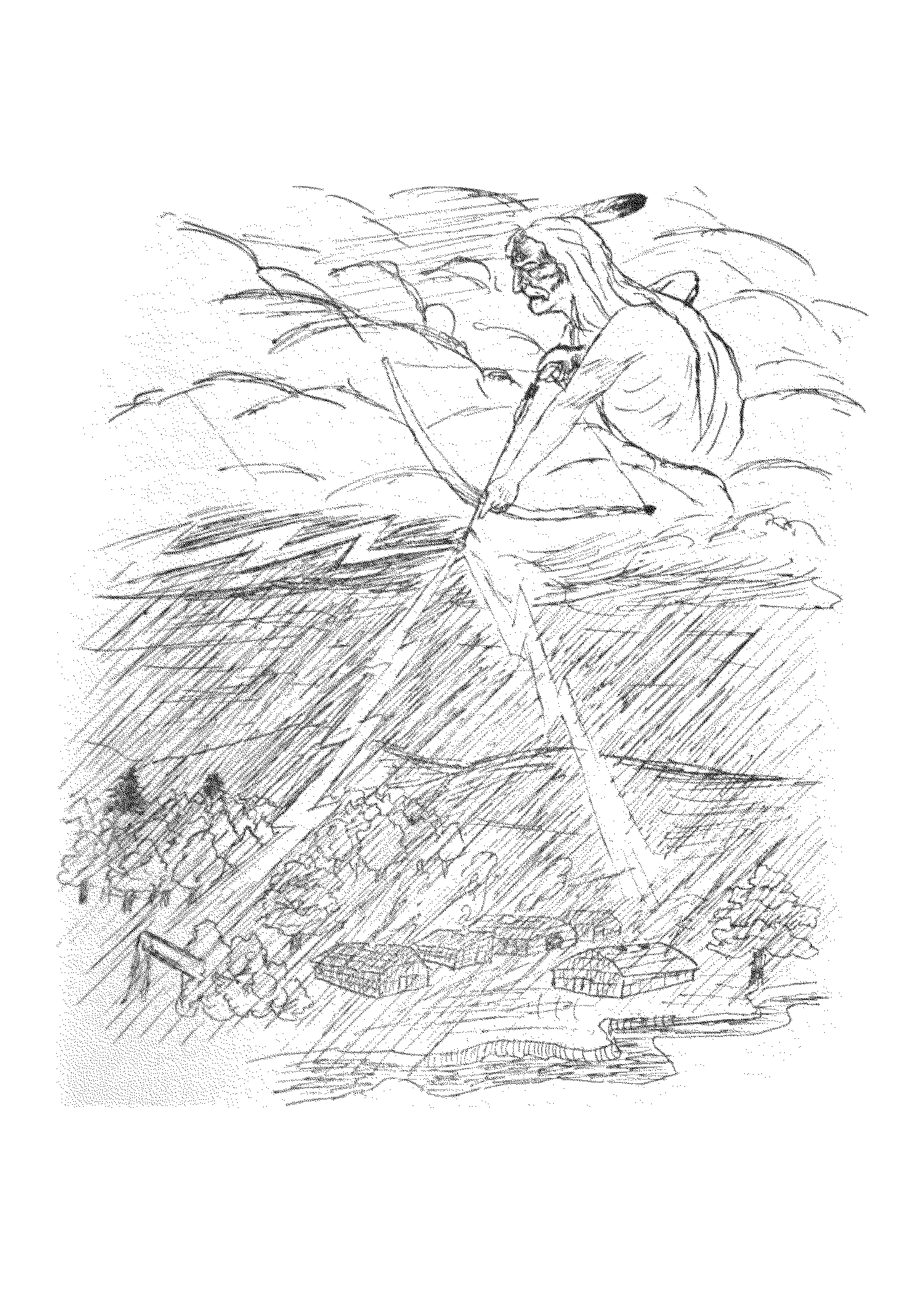
Hé-no as drawn by Jesse Cornplanter, a Seneca artist, 1908

Hé-no (Cayuga: Hiˀnoˀ, Seneca: Hi’nö’) is a thunder spirit of the Haudenosaunee peoples. He is also known as Heno, Hino, Hinu or Hinun.

Hé-no lives in the cloud of the far west, and has rainbow as his wife, and is accompanied by the eagles Keneu and Oshadagea (Seneca: Osháda’gé:a’). Keneu is a golden eagle and Oshadagea carries a lake of dew on its back, which it will sprinkle as rain after fire spirits attack the land. Hé-no is armed with bow and arrows, and carries with him a pouch of thunderbolts. When travelling in the skies, he also carries a basket of chert boulders on his back, which he hurls at evil spirits. The boulders that miss fall to earth in the form of lightning. He wears a magic feather on his head to ward off evil, and has two assistants who carried no names, so they can serve Hé-no in secrecy.

Hé-no was described as peaceful and benevolent, being the enemy of witches and evil persons, and the friend of corn, beans and squashes. Apart from being associated with thunders, Hé-no was also thought to form clouds and give water to the earth.

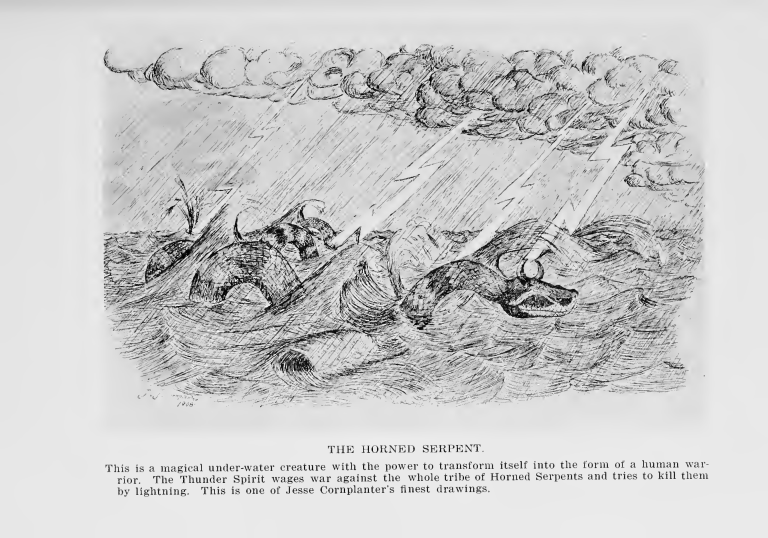
Hé-no battles the Great Water Snake drawn by Jesse Cornplanter, a Seneca artist, 1908

In Haudenosaunee mythology, Hé-no descended to earth twice. On the first occasion, Gunnodoyak, a young hero who was the servant of Hé-no and empowered with the spirit of thunder, was commanded to kill the Great Water Snake of the Great Lakes, enemy of mankind, but Gunnodoyak was swallowed by the serpent instead. Hé-no then slain the serpent at Lake Ontario with his flaming arrows shot from the sky, cut open its belly and resurrected Gunnodoyak, who was then taken to heaven. Upon the serpent's death, its body broke into small pieces which formed the islands of the Great Lakes. The indigenous people considered the violent waves of Lake Ontario to be the serpent moving in vengeance. On the second occasion, Hé-no saved his people by slaying the Stone Giants (Note: Cayuga: Ganéhwa:s; Seneca: Gë:nö:sgwa’) of the west. The Stone Giants' shattered bodies became pebbles. Hé-no is also credited with sending three Thunderers (Note: Oneida: Latihsakayu·téhseˀ; Onondaga: Hadiwęnodá·dye’s; Cayuga: Hadiwęnódagyeˀs; Seneca: hadiwënodaje’s) to earth every year to destroy evil.

He once lived in a cave under Niagara Falls. At that time a young girl living above the falls was engaged to marry a disagreeable old man. Rather than marry him she climbed into a canoe and headed down the river. The girl and the canoe were carried over the falls; the canoe was seen falling to destruction, but the girl disappeared. Hé-no and his two (nameless) assistants caught her in a blanket and brought her back to his cave. One of the assistants, taken with her beauty, married her.

== See also ==
- Lelawala
