= Mannegishi =

Tricksters from Cree folklore

The Mannegishi (singular the same) are a race of trickster people in Cree folklore. They are probably related to the Memegwesi of Ojibwa origin.
