= Onondaga people =

Haudenosaunee group of the Eastern Woodlands of North America

Onondaga Onoñdaʼgegáʼ
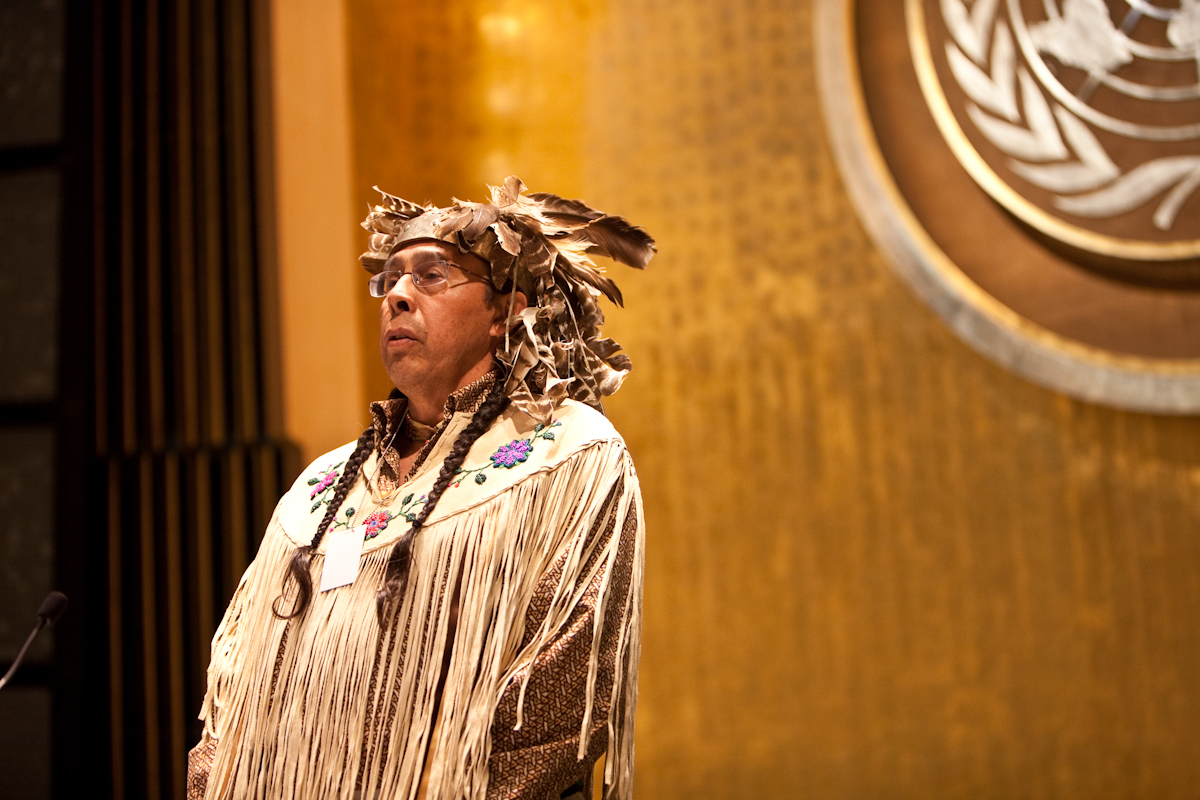
- Tadodaho Sid Hill, Traditional Chief of the Onondaga Nation at the United Nations Permanent Forum on Indigenous Issues

Regions with significant populations
- United States (New York): Unknown
- Canada (Ontario): 2,894 (2019)

Languages
- English, Onondaga, other Iroquoian languages

Religion
- Haudenosaunee mythology, Longhouse/Gai'hwi:io, Kanoh'hon'io, Kahni'kwi'io, Christianity

Related ethnic groups
- Oneida people, Mohawk people, Cayuga people, Seneca people, other Iroquoian peoples

nųd / noñd "hill"
- People: Onųdáˀgegáˀ / Onoñdaʼgegáʼ
- Language: Onųdáˀgegáˀ / Onoñdaʼgegáʼ
- Country: Onų·dáˀgeh / Onoñdáʼgeh; Haudenosauneega

The Onondaga people (/ˌɒnənˈdɔːɡə/; Onondaga: Onoñdaʼgegáʼ IPA: [onũdaʔgegáʔ]), lit. 'People of the Hills') are one of the five original nations of the Haudenosaunee (Iroquois) Confederacy in the Northeastern Woodlands of North America. Their historical homelands are centered in and around present-day Onondaga County, New York, south of Lake Ontario.

The most centrally located nation of the Haudenosaunee, the Onondaga are considered the "Keepers of the Fire" (Onondaga: honatjisdané·doñʼ) in the figurative longhouse that shelters the Five Nations. The Cayuga and Seneca have territory to their west and the Oneida and Mohawk to their east. The League Council traditionally met at Onondaga, the Haudenosaunee government's capital, as the traditional chiefs do today.

In the United States, the home of the federally recognized Onondaga Nation is the Onondaga Reservation. Onondaga people also live near Brantford, Ontario on Six Nations territory as part of the Bearfoot Onondaga First Nation and Onondaga Clear Sky First Nation.

== History ==
According to oral tradition, the Great Peacemaker approached the Onondaga and four other nations to found the Haudenosaunee. The Onondaga were the last of the five nations to join the confederacy, only acceding when the Peacemaker, Jigonhsasee, and Hiawatha healed the Onondaga chief Tadodaho of his evil ways. The tradition tells that at the time the Seneca nation debated joining the Haudenosaunee based on the Great Peacemaker's teachings, a solar eclipse took place. The most likely eclipse visible in the area was in 1142 AD.

Archeological studies support the timing of this oral tradition. Carbon dating of particular sites of Onondaga habitation shows dates starting close to 1200AD ± 60 years with growth for hundreds of years.

In the American Revolutionary War, the Onondaga were at first officially neutral, although individual Onondaga warriors were involved in at least one raid on American settlements. After Americans attacked their main village on April 20, 1779, the Onondaga later sided with the majority of the League and fought against the American colonists in alliance with the British. In 1779, George Washington ordered the termination of the Onondaga people, in an operation known as the Sullivan Expedition, breaking the neutrality agreement and devastating the Onondaga people. When the United States won independence, many Onondaga followed Joseph Brant to Upper Canada, where they were given land by the British Crown at Six Nations. This territory used to be Haudenosaunee hunting grounds, but much of the Confederacy relocated there as a result of the American Revolution. Although the British promised the security of Haudenosaunee homelands, the 1783 Treaty of Paris ceded the territory over to the United States.

In the aftermath of the Sullivan Expedition, following the brutal winter of 1780, there was a massive swarm of periodical cicadas (Ogweñ·yó’da’), which emerge from underground every seventeen years. The sudden arrival of such a large quantity of the insects provided a source of sustenance for the Onondaga people who were experiencing severe food insecurity following the Sullivan campaigns and the subsequent brutal winter. The seemingly miraculous arrival of the cicadas (specifically, Brood VII also known as the Onondaga brood) is commemorated by the Onondaga as an intervention by the Creator to ensure their survival after such a traumatizing, catastrophic event.

On November 11, 1794, the Onondaga Nation, along with the other Haudenosaunee nations, signed the Treaty of Canandaigua with the United States, in which their right to their homeland was acknowledged by the United States in article II of the treaty.

In 1815, Handsome Lake, the Seneca half-brother of Cornplanter and author of his eponymous Code, died at Onondaga. In 1816, 450 Onondaga were living in New York, 210 of whom lived on Buffalo Creek Reservation.

== Culture ==
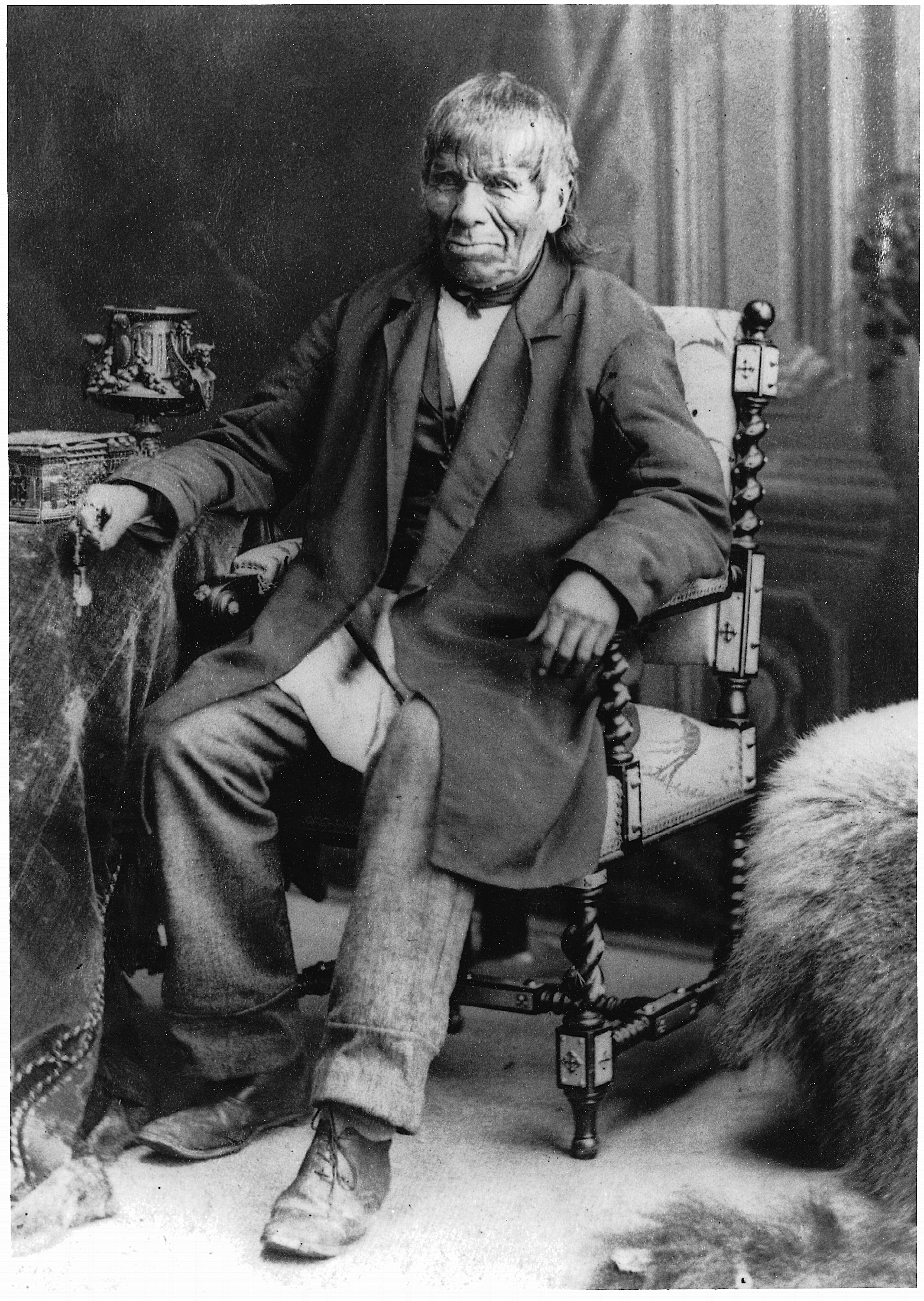
Chief Isaac Hill Kaweneseronton, taken in Montreal in 1870 at William Notman's studio.

=== Clans ===
Like other Haudenosaunee peoples, Onondaga people are subdivided into a number of clans, led by Clan Mothers. Clans and nationality descend matrilineally, meaning that clan membership, as well as membership in the Onondaga generally, is inherited from one's mother. The clan system extends throughout the Haudenosaunee, and clan members from other Haudenosaunee nations are considered family. In total there are nine clans divided into two moieties:

Longhouse side (Gaye·i Ganoñhsgéh Ha·gwah):

- Beaver (Honaga·ya’gih)
- Heron (Degaeñhyagáhä·’)
- Snipe (Dahwisdahwís or Odi’nehsi·yóh)
- Turtle (Hadi·nyáhdęh)
- Wolf (Hothahyųníh)

Mudhouse side (Dega’daägeh Ha·gwah):

- Bear (Ohgwá·ih)
- Deer (Sgęnędųhé·nųʼ or Deyodijinaeñ’doñ·da’)
- Eel (Ogų·dé·naʼ)
- Hawk (Gwiyęʼgwiyę́·ʼ, Hadishwęʼgáiyoh, Degaya’dakhwa’, or Odishweñ’gai·yo’)

Onondaga peoples believe it is their duty to help and support their clan in tough times, sickness, and death. Interclan marriages are mandatory, so a member of one clan can only marry someone outside of their clan.

=== Customs ===
The Onondaga practice the sprinkling of ashes when juggling the treatment of the sick. They also do a public confession of sins upon a string of wampum (gaswę́hdaʼ). The wampum is employed in all matters of public importance. Their funerals were known to be quiet and solemn, with the women covering their faces. There were also special events such as the Planting Feast which would happen in May or when the Onondaga believed the ground was ready. This was three days for penitential and religious services. One day for the children's dance, and one each for the Four Persons (Gayéi Nihęnadí Deyųkhiyęʼniyá·dųʼ), the Holder for the Heavens (Thayęhya·wáʼgih), the Thunder, and for gambling. The Strawberry Feast (Hųdáhyaets) comes when the berries are ripe. This day there are dancing for the Thunder and a feast of strawberries. The Green Bean Dance comes when the green beans are fit for use. This day there are dances for the Thunder and a mixture of war and feather dances. The Green Corn dance always comes after the Green Bean dance. This day there are three days for religious services, one for the children, one for the Four Persons, one for the Holder of the Heavens, and one for the Thunder with the feast. The Onondaga's Thanksgiving feast in October closely resembled the Green Corn Dance.

The Onondaga peoples place great emphasis on giving thanks, and this is reflected in their ceremonies. Ceremonial songs would be performed in the longhouse, and danced to in a counter-clockwise direction since this is the life-providing direction of Mother Earth (Ethino·ha tsha’ Oñhweñja·de’), Grandmother Moon (Ethihsoda ahsoñhekhá gáähgwa·’), and stars (Ojisdeñnohgwaeñnyoñ). The more spirited the singing and dancing, the more thanks is given to the Creator. The Onondaga peoples rely on the lunar calendar for their ceremonies that occur, and the Faithkeepers (hona·di·hų́·da) are responsible for initiating the ceremonies based on the different moons.

=== Sports ===
Lacrosse (gajihgwaʼéʼ or dehoñtjihgwaʼéh) and foot races (dehųwéyęk) are traditional favorites of the Onondaga people. The Onondaga also adopted many games from European settlers such as mumble the peg, marbles (ojihnyoʼgwaʼ), some games of ball, pull away, and fox and geese in the snow. Hide-and-seek and Blind man's buff were played but no games with song.

=== Archaeology ===
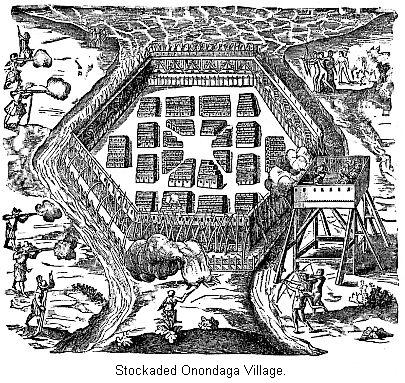
Sketch by Samuel de Champlain of his attack on an Onondaga village.

Archaeological work in the Onondaga homeland has revealed elements of their pre-colonial life ways. Common trends revealed by Onondaga archaeology include:

- the placement of villages on defensive high points away from rivers and the presence of defensive earthen embankments
- a gradual evolution of pottery vessels and smoking pipe forms and decorations
- a gradual evolution of stone and bone tools and implements
- continuity in subsistence systems
- continuity of house forms and inferred communal living
- the continued use of human face motifs
- evidence for bear ceremonialism

== Governments ==
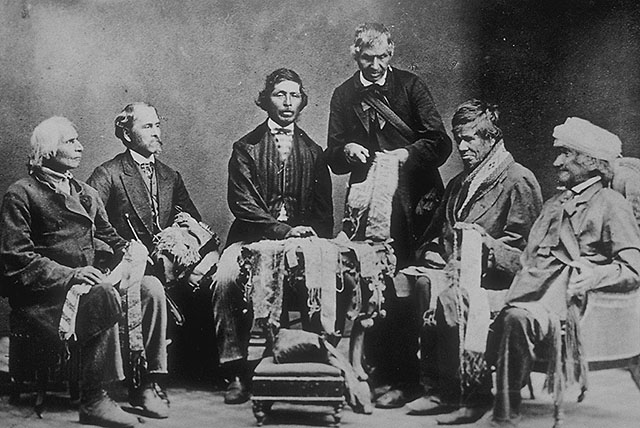
Iroquois Chiefs from the Six Nations Reserve reading wampum belts in Brantford, Ontario in 1871. Joseph Snow, Onondaga chief, is first on the left.

=== Traditional government ===
==== Structure ====
The Onondaga in New York follow the traditional Haudenosaunee matriarchal form of government, wherein Hodiyanéshu’ (chiefs, sing. Hoyá·neh) are condoled by their Clan Mother and serve at their pleasure, rather than being elected or inheriting their position. Clan Mothers can recall their Hoyá·neh if they judge them to be acting outside the interests of the clan and nation.

==== Role in the Haudenosaunee Confederacy ====
The culture hero Hayęhwáthaʼ was an Onondaga and was essential in the early organization of the Haudenosaunee League. The Tree of Peace (Sgaęhejiʼgó·nah or Jyonä·hdejiʼgó·nah) was planted on Onondaga Land. As a result, Onondaga has been regarded as the capital of the Haudenosaunee.

The chiefly title of Tadodaho (Thadodá·hoʼ) is always held by an Onondaga Hoyá·neh; he is the leading arbitrator of the Confederacy Chiefs and presiding officer of the Grand Council. The Onondaga chiefs are known as the Central Fire-Keepers (honatjisdané·daʼ) of the Confederacy and the guardians or watchkeepers of the League. They are keepers of the law in order to preserve traditions and institutions. The Onondaga maintain the largest number of chieftainship titles as well as the largest number of clans among the Haudenosaunee.

The Onondaga send fourteen chiefs to the Haudenosaunee Grand Council, where they serve as Firekeepers of the Confederacy.

=== Tribal and First Nations governments ===
The Onondaga have one federally recognized government in the United States and two First Nations Band Governments in Canada:

- Onondaga Nation at the Onondaga Reservation south of Nedrow, New York outside Syracuse
- Onondaga Clear Sky First Nation at Six Nations of the Grand River
- Bearfoot Onondaga First Nation at Six Nations of the Grand River, Ontario, Canada

== Notable people ==
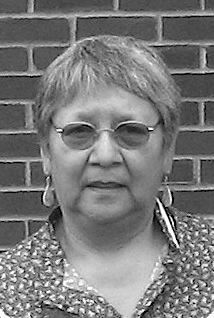
Rose Doctor, Onondaga people, Wolf Clan Clan Mother

- Leon Shenandoah (Thadodá·hoʼ, 1915–1996), Tadodaho
- Oren Lyons (Joagquisho, born 1930), traditionalist, orator, artist, and athlete
- Tom Longboat (Cogwagee, 1886–1949), Grand River Onondaga distance runner
- Dinah John (Ta-wah-ta-whe·jah·quah, c. 1774–1883), supercentenarian
- Canassatego (c. 1684–1750), Onondaga leader, diplomat, and spokesperson known for his speech at the 1744 Treaty of Lancaster, where he recommended that the British colonies emulate the Haudenosaunee by forming a confederacy.
- Sid Hill (Thadodá·hoʼ), Tadodaho
- Samuel George (Honoñwiyéhdih, 'Hononwirehdonh' or 'Great Wolf', 1795–1873), chief from 1850 to 1873
- Madge Skelly (1903–1993), actress, director, speech pathologist
- Lyle Thompson (Deyhahsanoondey, born 1992), professional lacrosse player
- Tonya Gonnella Frichner (1947–2015), lawyer and activist
- Eric Gansworth (born 1965), poet, novelist, and visual artist
- Alfred Warner Jacques (1949–2023), craftsman of traditional wooden lacrosse sticks, American lacrosse player

== Other spellings encountered ==
- Onöñda'gega, Onondaga language
- Onontakeka, Oneida language
- Onondagaono, Seneca language

== See also ==
- Onondaga language
- HMCS Onondaga (S73) Oberon Class submarine
- John Arthur Gibson
