= Sanford Plummer =

Early 20th-century Seneca painter from New York (1905–1974)

- Ga-yo-gwa-doke
- Meeting of Hiawatha and Deganawidah by Sanford Plummer
- Born: 1 November 1905; Allegany Reservation, Cattaraugus, New York, U.S.
- Died: June 1974 (aged 68); Gowanda, New York, U.S.
- Education: Beaux-Arts of New York; New York Academy of Art
- Known for: Narrative watercolor painting
- Movement: Iroquois Realist School

Sanford Plummer (Seneca: Ga-yo-gwa-doke; November 1, 1905 - June 1974) (Seneca) was a Native American narrative watercolor painter from New York State. He painted works portraying traditional life and culture of the Seneca and people of other Haudenosaunee nations. His works are held by the Iroquois Indian Museum, as well as Buffalo Museum of Science, Rochester Museum and Science Center, and the Newark Museum.

== Background ==
Sanford Plummer was born on 1 November 1905 on the Allegany Reservation, located mostly in Cattaraugus, New York, in the Seneca Nation. His parents were Clarence Plummer and Nellie Kennedy. He was born into the Seneca Wolf Clan, his mother's clan, as the Haudenosaunee have a matrilineal kinship system. Plummer's Seneca name was Ga-yo-gwa-doke.

He went to New York City for a formal art education at the Beaux-Arts of New York and the New York Academy of Art. After his studies, Plummer returned to upstate, where he lived in Gowanda.

== Art career ==
Highly skilled at narrative art, Plummer painted traditional Haudenosaunee lifeways, ceremonies, and representation of oral history, such as his piece Law, the Reading of the Wampum. Most of Plummer's paintings have spare backgrounds, keeping the focus on the figures. The elements in his work were all symbolic and significant to the interpretation. A few of his works feature full and lush backgrounds, particularly a detailed portrait of Seneca chief Red Jacket. His work follows in the tradition of the 19th-century Iroquois Realist School.

During the 1930s, Plummer briefly participated in the New Deal program for arts under the Temporary Emergency Relief Administration (TERA), headed in New York by Seneca anthropologist Arthur C. Parker. The program paid artists on New York Indian reservations to create traditional arts. By 1934, the TERA program arranged for Native art to be distributed to museum collections. Another participating artist was Seneca woodcarver Jesse Cornplanter. The program created a temporary tribal museum at the Thomas Indian School and Orphan Asylum. After budgetary shortfalls, this was the first project to be eliminated. Parker is thought to have exerted a positive influence on Plummer's art career.

When Pennsylvania Governor Arthur H. James was adopted into the Seneca Nation in a ceremony on 24 August 1940, he was presented with a hand-lettered and painted scroll made by Plummer. The artist had painted a Seneca man greeting and sharing a pipe with a European-American man, followed by calligraphy in the Seneca language.

== Legacy ==
Sanford Plummer died in Gowanda, New York in June 1974.

The Newark Museum has a substantial collection of Plummer's works on paper. These include watercolor paintings, pencil illustrations, and a design for a book cover. The collection was donated to that museum by IBM from its holdings in 1962. The Rochester Museum and Science Center and Buffalo Museum of Science also hold his paintings in their collections.
