= Haudenosaunee art =

From the native people of North America

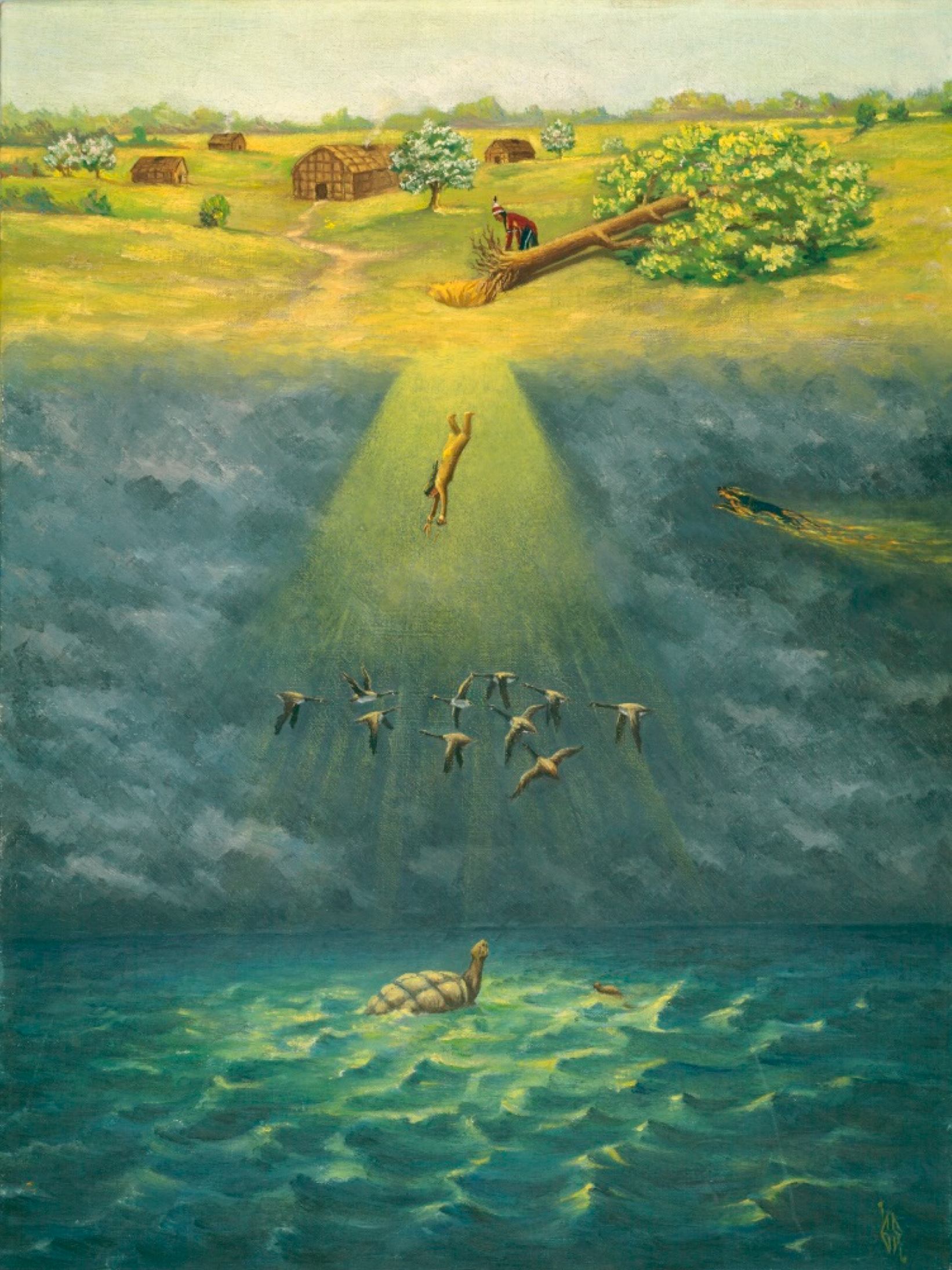
- Sky Woman, by Ernest Smith (1936)
- People: Haudenosaunee (Iroquois)
- Region: Northeastern Woodlands, North America
- Period: Pre-Columbian era to present
- Notable forms: Wood carving, pottery, quillwork, beadwork, husk work, silverwork, Realist School painting
- Notable artists: David Cusick, Jesse Cornplanter, Ernest Smith, G. Peter Jemison, Shelley Niro

Haudenosaunee art consists of the visual arts of the Haudenosaunee (Iroquois), native peoples of North America. In addition to painting and sculpture, Haudenosaunee art includes clothing, jewelry, pottery, baskets, and wampum. Its symbolism often relates to nation, clan, history, and the natural world.

== Historic art ==
Much of what is known about earlier Haudenosaunee art came through the efforts of 19th century anthropologist Lewis Henry Morgan. His immersion with Seneca cultural informants and collecting helped preserve a lot of early art in lithographic plates and formed the foundation for scholarship on the topic. A 1911 fire in the New York State Capitol building in Albany destroyed nearly a third of the Morgan collection. Seneca anthropologist Arthur C. Parker, a direct descendant of those that had worked with Morgan, entered the burning building to save artifacts. He was then instrumental in rebuilding the collection.

Historically, Haudenosaunee art consisted of visual representation often found on wood surfaces such as clubs, grave posts, war posts, longhouses, or living trees. From the 16th and 17th centuries on, bowls, pottery and clay pipes, show a mixture of animal, geometrical, and human imagery.

Porcupine quillwork was sewn onto bags, clothing, and moccasins, usually in geometrical designs. At harvest time, Haudenosaunee women would use corn husks to make hats, dolls, rope, and moccasins.

Early Haudenosaunee baskets involved thin splints made of black ash. Beginning in the late 19th century, basket makers started using sweetgrass and special weaves. Haudenosaunee artists sold these baskets throughout Ontario, New York State, and Quebec as early as the mid 19th Century.

Early Haudenosaunee beadwork was primarily with shells, but native artists adapted their style with the arrival of glass beads from Europe. Silver was much valued by the Haudenosaunee from the 17th century onward, and by the 18th century, the Haudenosaunee became accomplished silversmiths, making silver earrings, gorgets, and rings.

Engraved designs found on the neck and rim of clay pots are thought to represent water and the mountains. The "great turtle" upon which North America was said to rest was a recurring motif. Beads and clothes often featured semi-circles and waves meant to represent the "sky dome," the three levels of the Haudenosaunee cosmos (the Celestial world, our world and the world of darkness).

Floral designs were first introduced in the 17th century, reflecting French influence, but did not become widespread until the 19th century. Starting about 1850, Haudenosaunee artists frequently featured floral designs on moccasins, caps, pouches and pincushions.

=== Iroquois Realist School ===
In the early to mid-19th Century, the Iroquois Realist School emerged in art. Tuscarora artists Dennis and David Cusick were leading figures in this movement. This was an integration of Haudenosaunee culture with Western-introduced flat media such as watercolor. The school adapted tribal iconography, ancestral stories, and scenes of everyday life. The realist school was a loose association, with other artists among the group such as Tuscarora artist Thomas Jacobs.

== Contemporary art ==
=== Seneca Arts Program and revival ===
With the increase in available mass manufactured goods, more "functional" Haudenosaunee art such as pottery saw a decline. Demand for Haudenosaunee made arts and crafts shifted to a more tourist market base. Some native artists responded to this demand by shifting their work to be more Pan-Indian or Plains Indian styled, to fit more the consumers idea of what native art should look like to be "authentic".

Beginning in the 1930s, Haudenosaunee artists began to be collected more by non-native museums and collectors, especially in two-dimensional art forms. Arthur C. Parker's advocacy with the Works Progress Administration's to create the Seneca Arts Program was a driving force behind interest in and market for Haudenosaunee art. In a six year period, the program was estimated to have to have produced over 5,000 different works ranging from traditional Haudenosaunee craft to murals and illustrations.

Parker's work helped encourage and promote Haudenosaunee artists like Jesse Cornplanter, Ernest Smith, and Sanford Plummer. Cornplanter, a direct descendant of Seneca chief Cornplanter, illustrated scenes of historic Haudenosaunee life throughout an over four decade career, primarily in pen-and-ink. His 1938 book Legends of the Longhouse consisted of his retelling of Haudenosaunee legend and his accompanying illustration.

Sanford Plummer (Seneca) was more Western-trained as an artist, having studied at Beaux-Arts Institute of Design and the National Academy School of Fine Art. He was active in the 1930s and 1940s and had work collected in Buffalo, Newark, and in Rochester. Plummer worked in watercolor, painting traditional and historical Haudenosaunee scenes in a minimalist style.

Ernest Smith (Seneca) was an especially popular artist from this period. Smith's style changed throughout his career, shifting at various times between Cornplanter, Studio School, and even Walt Disney-influenced styles. He also illustrated scenes from Haudenosaunee legend such as the fall of Sky Woman to Turtle Island. His work is highly collected by the Rochester Museum and Science Center.

=== Post-war and contemporary era ===
Following World War II, a few Haudenosaunee pursued degrees in fine arts from American universities and careers as artists. Peter Jones (Seneca), a ceramic artist, attended the then new Institute of American Indian Arts in Santa Fe. His work has been displayed and collected internationally. His pottery has sought to emulate traditional Haudenosaunee pit-firing methods. Another artist, Oren Lyons, an Onondaga Faithkeeper, received a Bachelor of Fine Arts from Syracuse University. He went on to have a career as an artist illustrating greeting cards and later depicting scenes from Haudenosaunee culture and history.

The growth and revival of Haudenosaunee art led to the 1976 creation of the Association for the Advancement of Native North American Arts and Crafts in Niagara Falls, New York. The association was responsible for the important 1983 text Iroquois Arts: A Directory of a People and Their Work which documented 568 individual Haudenosaunee artists. In 1989, the Smithsonian Institution created the National Museum of the American Indian, with two Haudenosaunee artists (Rick Hill and Jolene Rickard) advising and contributing art).

In the 1990s, artists like Rickard (Tuscarora), Shelley Niro (Mohawk), and Alan Michelson (Mohawk) came to prominence. They, along with artists like G. Peter Jemison (Seneca), Katsitsionni Fox (Mohawk), and Elizabeth Doxtator (Mohawk), remained active into the 21st Century. Haudenosaunee artists have worked in a variety of media including painting, assemblage, video, site-specific installations, and sculpture. Modern work often addresses themes of Haudenosaunee history, the impacts of colonialism, cultural continuity, innovation, and resilience.

=== Perception ===
Haudenosaunee art, especially basket and beadwork, has often been seen by the Western art world as inferior to painting and sculpture. It has been confined to the lesser category of crafts. Among the Haudenosaunee, as in other native cultures, there does not exist the same divide between functional and "fine" art. Western collectors and critics often consider only pre-contact and early-contact work as "authentic." Morgan's early work, while pivotal to the preservation of Haudenosaunee art and history, helped establish the idea of what counts as authentic Haudenosaunee art and what did not. Contemporary artists therefore may face alternate pressures either to create "real" native art, or go the opposite route and create art more easily accessible to non-native viewers.

The Iroquois Museum in Howes Cave, New York "uses contemporary Iroquois/Haudenosaunee art as a window into understanding Haudenosaunee culture, history, and traditions." The Rochester Museum and Science Center's permanent exhibit of Haudenosaunee art presents artists through the framework of narrative sovereignty, "the rights of people to tell their own stories". Museums also increasingly present Haudenosaunee art as continuous, rather than broken up into pre- and post-contact periods.

== Gallery ==
Haudenosaunee art

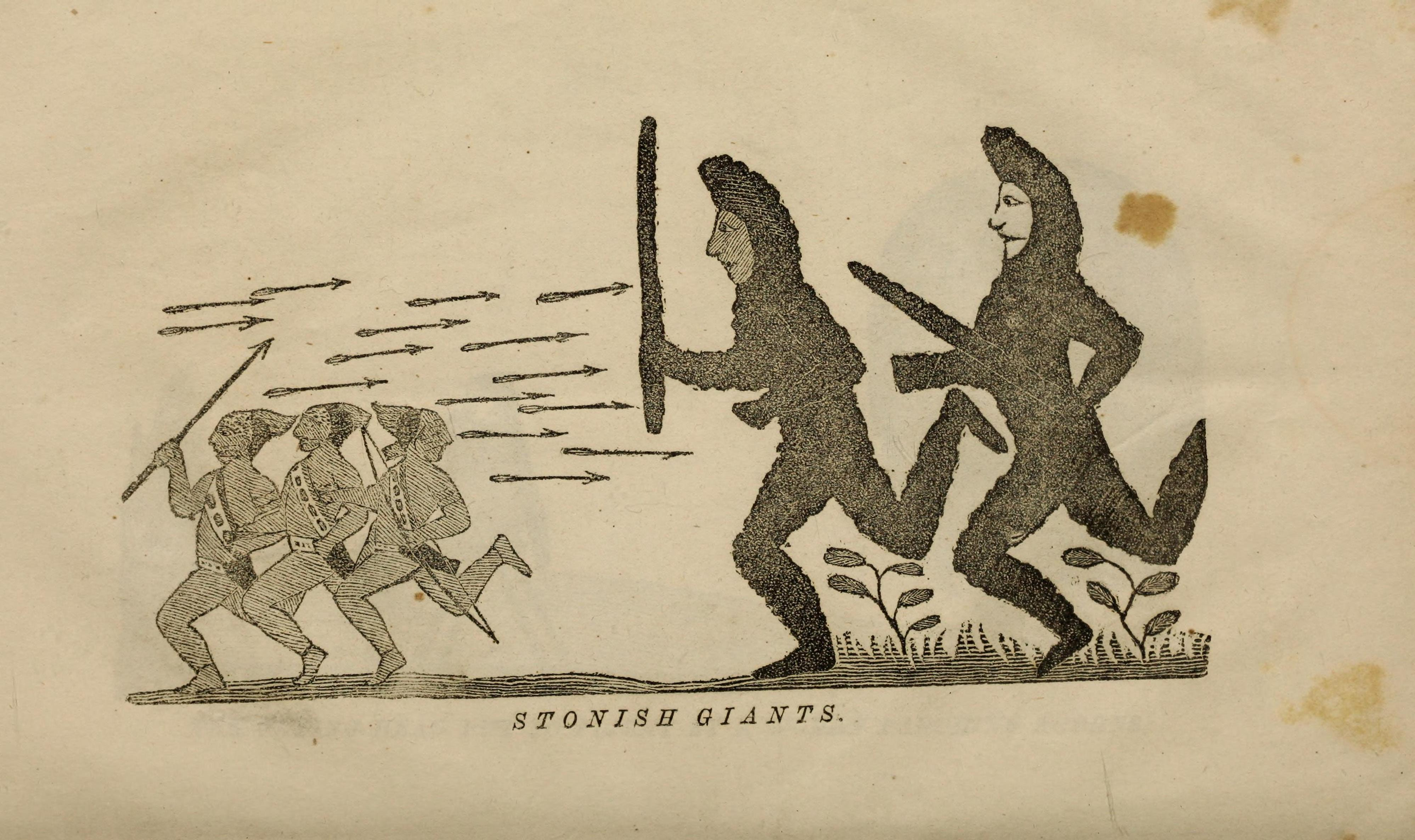
Stonish Giants, engraving by David Cusick

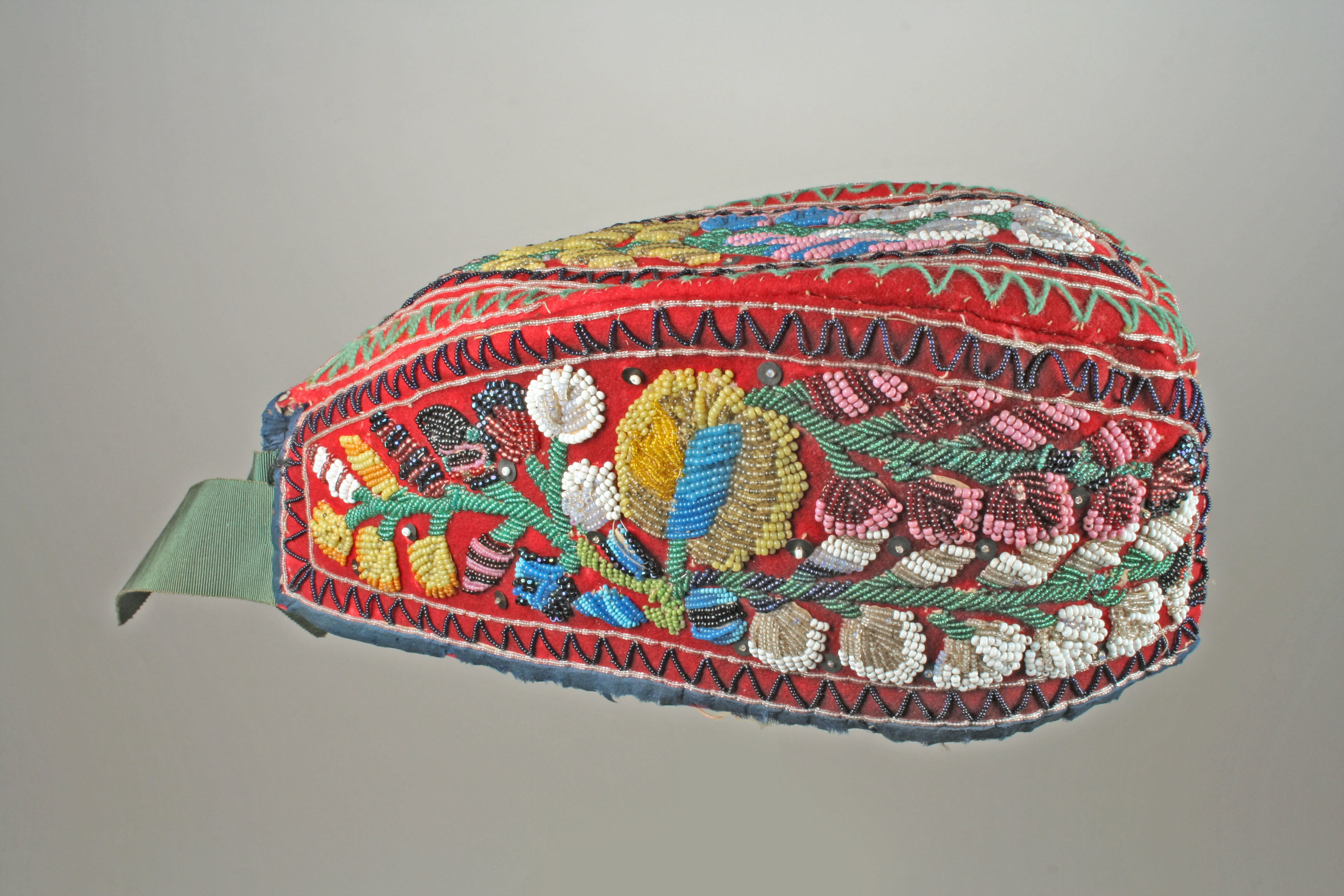
Glengarry style cap, circa 1880

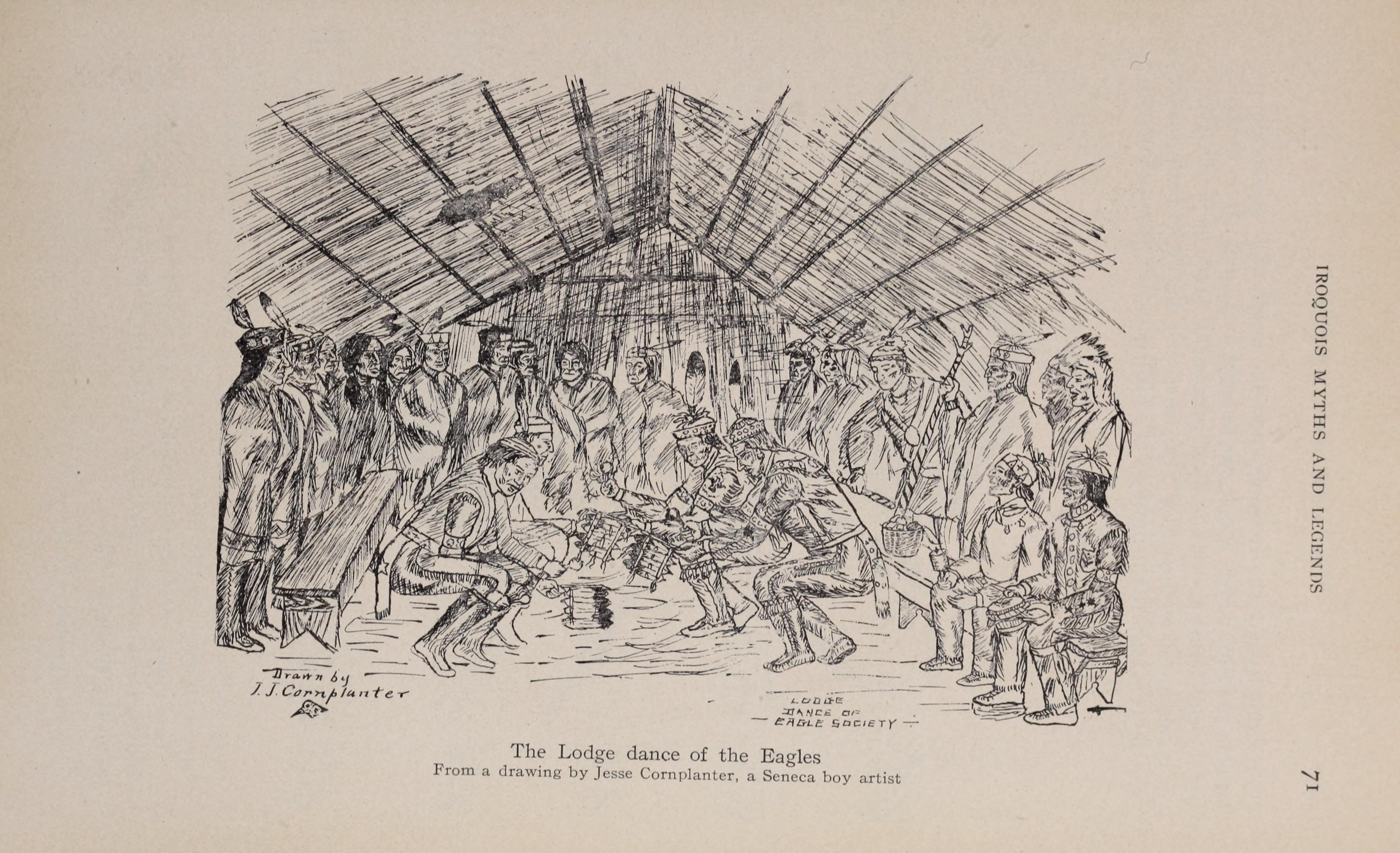
"The Lodge dance of the Eagles" by Jesse Cornplanter

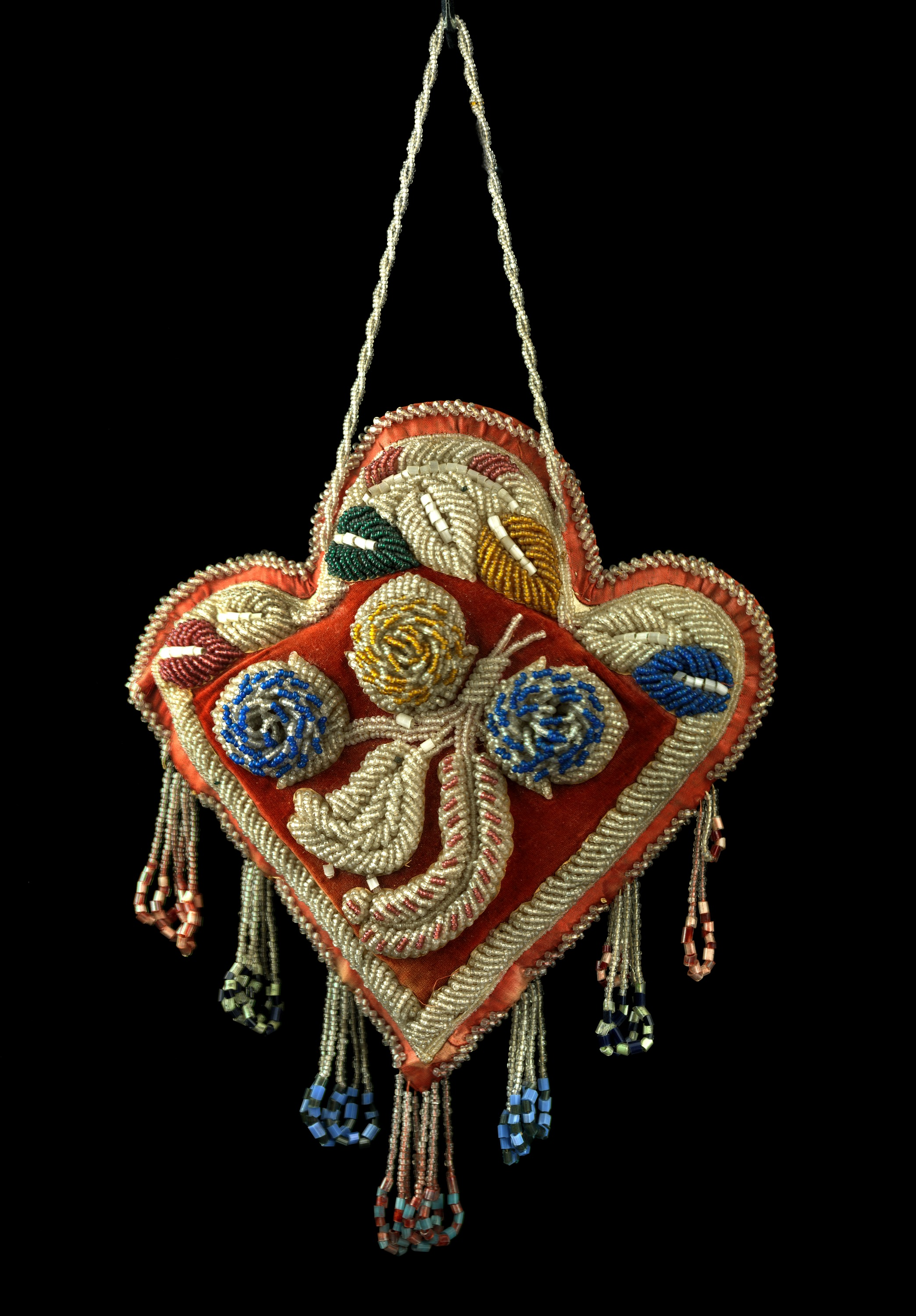
Beaded heart, by unknown Seneca artist, c. 1890

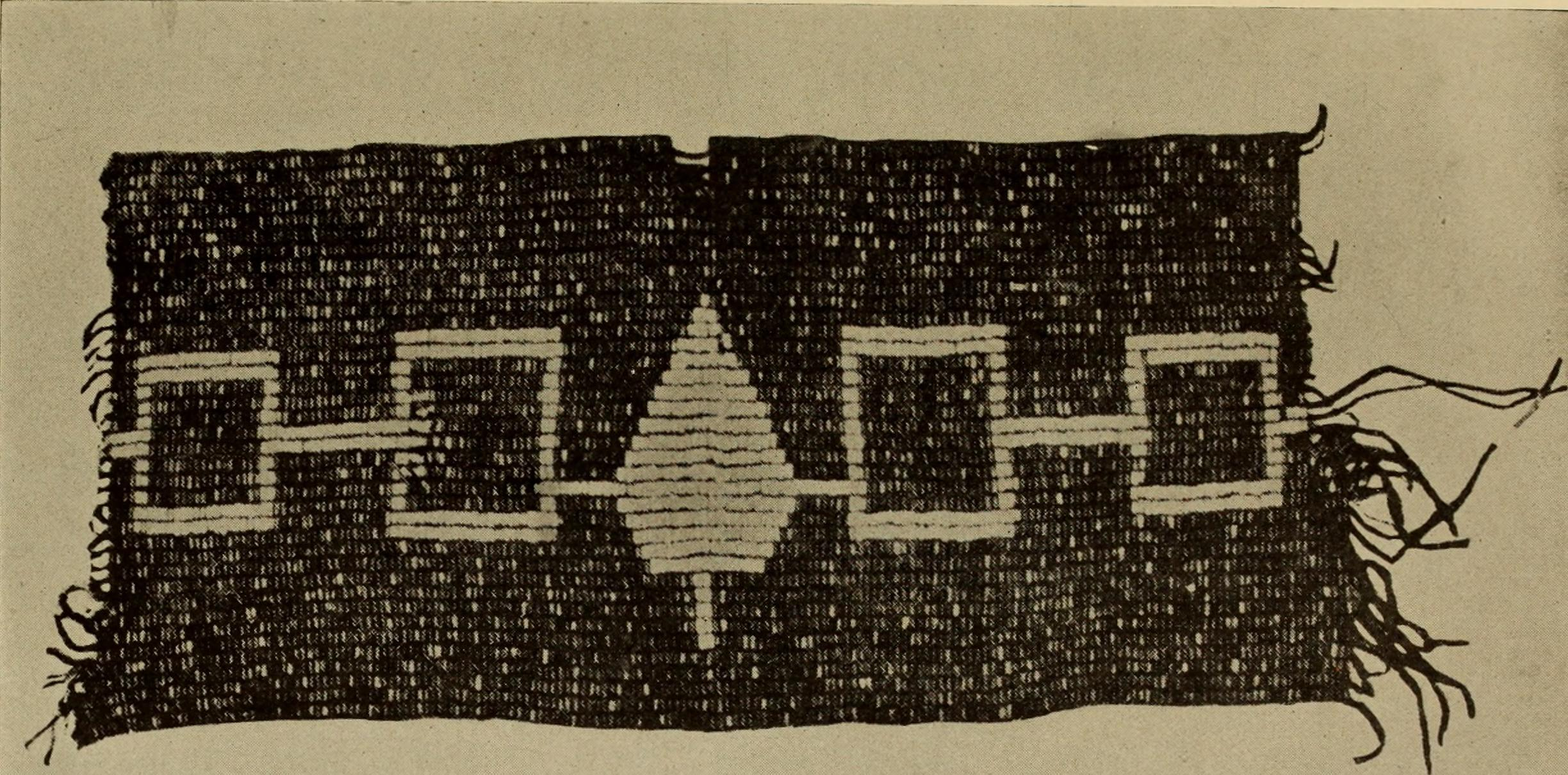
Hiawatha Belt, precontact wampum belt

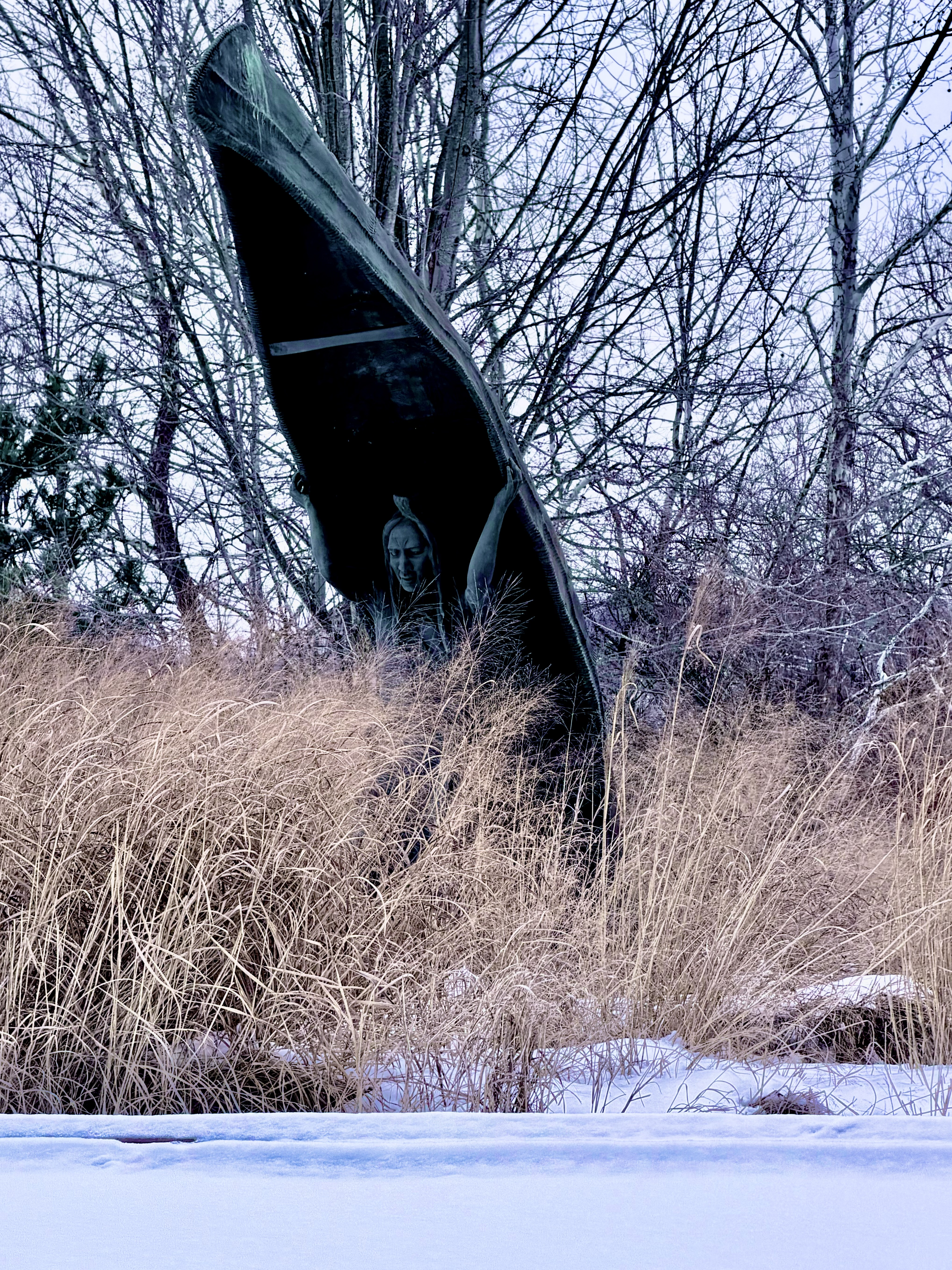
Statue by Peter B. Jones

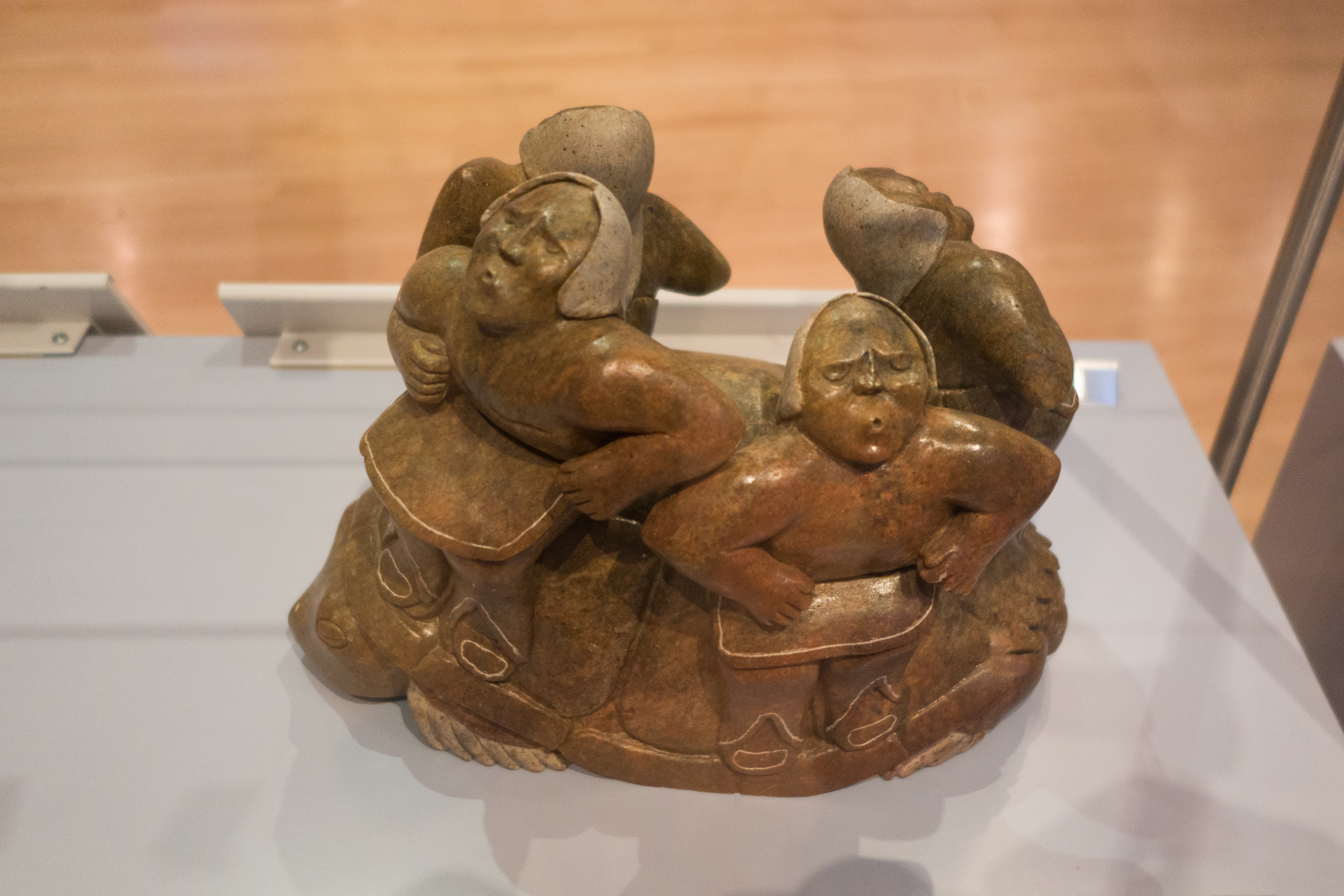
Cayuga sculpture
