= Hiawatha (1913 film) =

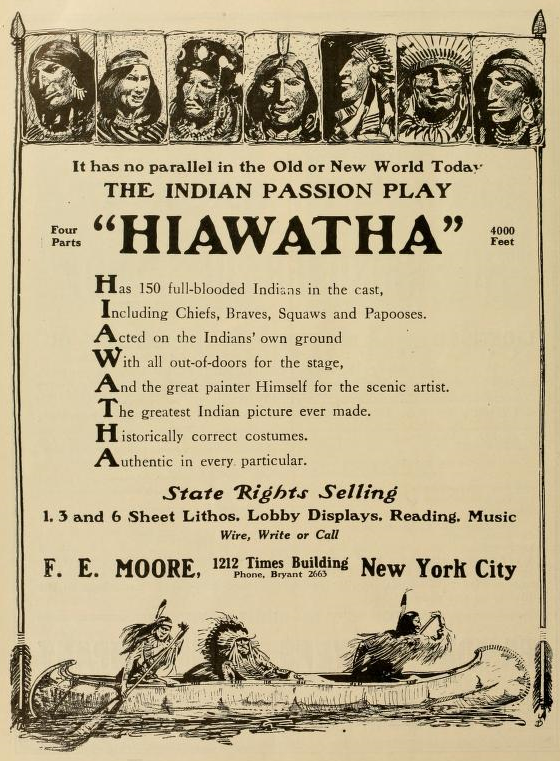
- Advertisement for Hiawatha 1913
- Directed by: Edgar Lewis
- Based on: The Song of Hiawatha by Henry Wadsworth Longfellow
- Produced by: Frank E. Moore
- Starring: Jesse Cornplanter; Soon-goot
- Cinematography: Victor Milner
- Music by: John Joseph Braham, Sr.
- Distributed by: States Rights
- Release date: March 1913
- Running time: 40 minutes (four reels)
- Country: United States
- Language: Silent (English intertitles)

Hiawatha is a 1913 American silent drama film directed by Edgar Lewis and based upon Henry Wadsworth Longfellow's epic poem The Song of Hiawatha (1855). The film stars Jesse Cornplanter of the Seneca people and Soon-goot, a 17-year-old unknown actress. The movie is the first feature film to use a cast of Native Americans.

== Plot ==
The story begins along the Lake Superior Michigan shoreline with the appearance of a mighty spirit that tells the Native Americans a peacekeeper will bring wisdom and unite the warring tribes. Hiawatha is born to Wenonah and after her death her mother Nokomis raises the child. Hiawatha becomes an excellent hunter and later weds Minnehaha, but she dies during a severe winter.

The final episodic adventure tells of the arrival of the "Black Robe" or missionary who brings Christianity to the Native Americans. Hiawatha welcomes him and proclaims the real prophet has arrived. As Hiawatha bids farewell to the warriors, he tells them to listen to the words of the missionary and then departs forever toward the sunset.

== Production ==
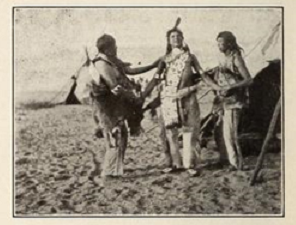
Jesse Cornplanter (center) in Hiawatha (1913).

Producer Frank E. Moore had previously staged the outdoor spectacle Hiawatha: The Indian Passion Play for nearly a decade before he launched his filmed version. Newspapers reported that 150 "full-blooded" Seneca of the Haudenosaunee (Iroquois Confederacy) from the Cattaraugus Reservation in upstate New York participated in the movie's production. For the lead role of Hiawatha, Moore hired Seneca actor-turned-artist Jesse Cornplanter, who later collaborated as an illustrator with ethnographer/archaeologist Arthur C. Parker and was the author of Legends of the Longhouse (1938). Jesse Cornplanter was a descendant of the 18th-century Seneca war chief and diplomat Cornplanter

The Anglo-American musical theater conductor John Joseph Braham, Sr. composed the musical score for Hiawatha. Braham would later compose the score for the 1913 Edward S. Curtis film, In the Land of the Head Hunters.

The movie's cinematographer Victor Milner suggested to Moore that Edgar Lewis, a former stage actor, should direct. Milner said that to achieve a superimposition of two images, he had to shoot the visioning of the famine of death on a separate negative and double print it.

Although other silent versions of Hiawatha existed before 1913, Moore's film was the first to use a cast of Native American actors. In 1909, Carl Laemmle, who founded Independent Moving Pictures (later absorbed into Universal Studios) had released an earlier one-reel version of Hiawatha. Years later Laemmle acknowledged that his "white cast smeared with bronze paint" was a target for ridicule. Laemmle's story ended with Hiawatha and Minnehaha happily embracing, but Moore's Hiawatha follows Longfellow's poem in which Minnehaha dies and Hiawatha welcomes the arrival of the missionary, who converts the Native Americans to the Christian faith. In 1910, Laemmle followed up his 1909 version of Hiawatha with the sequel, The Death of Minnehaha.

== Reception ==
Hiawatha opened at New York City's Berkeley theater where it achieved "splendid sales", according to the Moving Picture News. Moore distributed Hiawatha selling the film by states rights to 12 states. A review in Moving Picture World praised the film and said:

We have had such a fearful surfeit of blood-thirsty Indians, scalping Indians, howling Indians, gambling Indians and murdering and burning Indians in the cheap films that it was like a breath of fresh air to see real human Indians enacting before us an old Indian legend.

In April 1913, both the American Museum of Natural History and the American Scenic and Historic Preservation Society jointly presented Hiawatha at the museum with a simultaneous reading of Henry Wadsworth Longfellow's poem during the film's projection. The museum had lent Moore its expertise for the film and believed that Hiawatha had ethnographically redeeming features and educational appeal. One of the movie's highlights was a healing ritual of the sacred Iroquois False Face Society.

Hiawatha was originally four reels, or 40 minutes. The Motion Picture, Broadcasting & Recorded Sound Division in the Library of Congress owns only an abridged copy of the film.
