= Flying Head =

Cannibalistic spirit from Haudenosaunee and Wyandot mythology

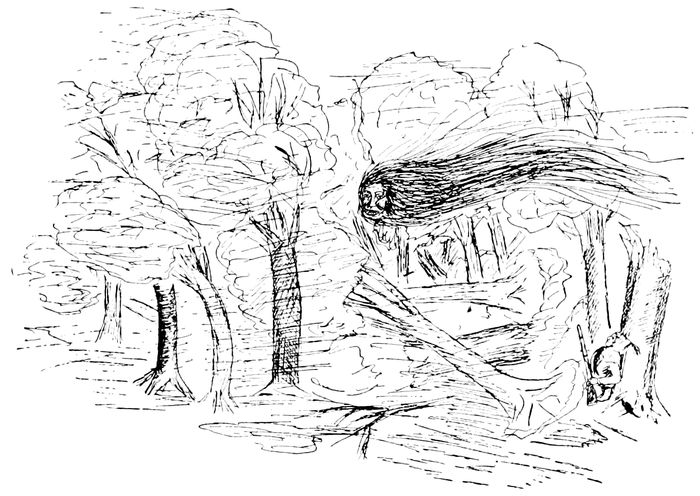
- 1923 illustration of a flying head by Jesse Cornplanter

Creature information
- Other name(s): Big Head; Mohawk: Kanontsistóntie's; Onondaga: Ganoñ’waeñ·dye’s; Cayuga: Shagonǫ:ˀaęˀyę́htaˀ; Seneca: Takwánö'ë:yët, Dagwánö’ë:yën; Tuscarora: Kunęhrayę́hnęh; Kunenhrayenhnenh; Kwennenhrayenhnen; Konearaunehneh; Unenhrayenhnenh; Ko-nea-rau-neh-neh; Ro-nea-rau-yeh-ne
- Grouping: Legendary creature
- Sub grouping: Spirit; Monster

Origin
- Country: New York, United States

The Flying Head (also known as Big Head or the Great Head) (Note: Other names include: Mohawk: Kanontsistóntie's, Onondaga: Ganoñ’waeñ·dye’s, Cayuga: Shagonǫ:ˀaęˀyę́htaˀ, Seneca: Takwánö'ë:yët or Dagwánö’ë:yën, and Tuscarora: Kunęhrayę́hnęh.) is a cannibalistic spirit from Haudenosaunee and Wyandot mythology.

== Description ==
According to both Haudenosaunee and Wyandot mythology, Flying Heads are described as being ravenous spirits that are cursed with an insatiable hunger. They are generally described as resembling a human head with long dark hair, "terrible eyes", and a large mouth filled with razor sharp fangs. In some versions, the Flying Head has a pair of bat wings jutting from each side of its cheek and bird-like talons. Other versions replace its bat wings with those of a bird. In all instances, they are described as being larger in size than that of the tallest man and possessing a hide that no weapon can penetrate.

== The legend ==
According to folklore, the Flying Head drove the original native inhabitants who lived in the area of the state of New York near the source of the Hudson River, in the Adirondack Mountains away from their hunting grounds before the Europeans came. In the early nineteenth century, a Mohawk guide in the town of Lake Pleasant, New York, who called himself Capt. Gill, claimed it was the Sacandaga Lake where the legend took place.

The tribe had their village on a hill that is now located behind the Hamilton County buildings. The name of the previous inhabitants has been lost to history and the legend of The Flying Head ensured that every neighboring tribe steered clear for many years. The Flying Head legend survives, but the name of the tribe who invented it is gone. The hill where the unknown tribe's village was located is considered cursed. Three different hotels were built on the sacred site and all three had a short life span and burned to the ground mysteriously. Captain Gill lived in a wigwam at the outlet of the lake, Lake Pleasant. He had a wife named Molly and Molly had a daughter named Molly Jr., whom Gill did not claim as his own.

== Legend origins ==
The Great God hath sent us signs in the sky we have heard uncommon noise in the heavens and have seen HEADS fall down upon the earth

— Speech of Tahayadoris a Mohawk sachem at Albany October 25, 1689

One version of the story says that there was once a very severe winter that killed off plants and drove the moose and deer to other areas. Local native hunters decided against following them. The fishing too failed and, according to legend, the famine became so severe that whole families began to die. Young members of the community began to talk of migrating from the area, surrounded as they were by hostile tribes, merely to shift their hunting ground for a season was not possible. They proposed a secret march to the great lake off to the west. They believed that once safely beyond the lake it would be easy enough to find a new home.

According to legend, the old men of the tribe were opposed to leaving their homelands and said that the journey was madness. They said too that the famine was a scourge which the Master of Life inflicted upon his people for their crimes; that if the punishment were endured, it would pass; if ran from, the results would follow them forever. The legend also states that the old men added that they would rather perish by inches on their native hills, that they would rather die that moment than leave their land forever to live with plenty upon strange lands. The legend goes on to say that the young men were enraged and promptly killed the old men.

After killing the elders, the question of the disposal of their remains was a problem. According to the legend, they wished in some way to sanctify the deed by offering up the bodies to the Master of Life. They agreed to decapitate the bodies, burn them, and to sink the heads together to the bottom of the lake. One of the young chiefs who planned the crime died when he became entangled in the ropes that bound the heads together and drowned.

The legend goes on to say that bubbles and slime appeared on the lake, heralding a terrible monster: a giant head with wings, which the tribe could apparently never escape.

== Other stories ==
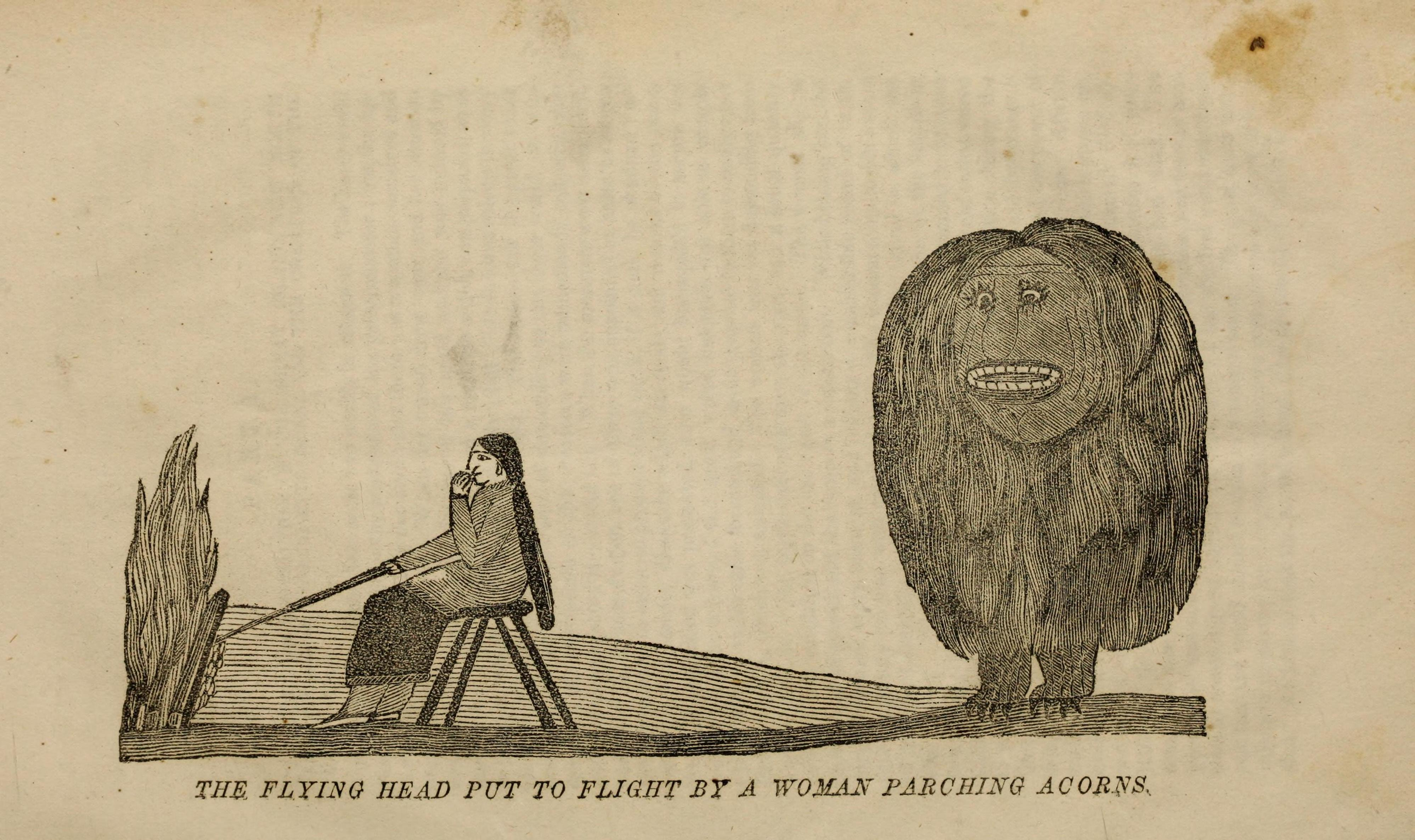
1916 illustration by David Cusick, "The flying head put to flight by a woman parching acorns"

Many of the Haudenosaunee were supposedly troubled by the Flying Head which, when it rested upon the ground, was taller than a man. This supposed monster was coated in thick black hair, it had wings like a bat, and talons.

One evening, the Flying Head came to the door of a lodge occupied by a lone woman. She was sitting before the fire roasting acorns which, as they became cooked, she took from the fire and ate. Terrified by the power of the woman, who he thought was eating live coals, the Flying Head left and never bothered her again. An alternate version of this part of the legend says that, rather than seeing a woman eating acorns and thinking she was eating live coals, the Flying Head stole live coals from her and tried to eat them, thinking they were acorns. The Flying Head flees in agony, never to be seen again.

== See also ==
- Chonchon
- Krasue
- Leyak
- Penanggalan
