= Jesse Cornplanter =

Seneca painter

Jesse Cornplanter Hayonhwonhish
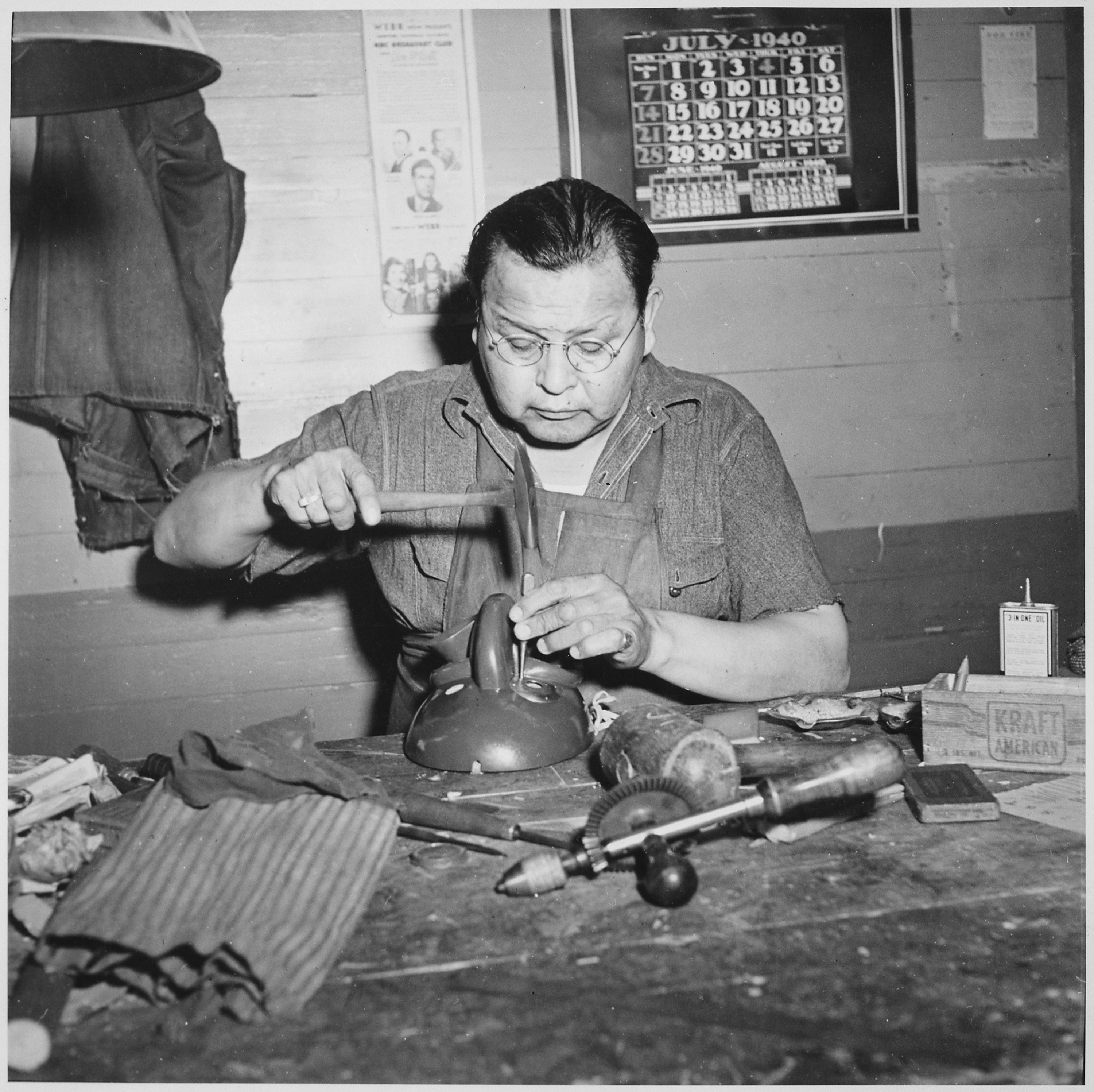
- Jesse Cornplanter making a ceremonial mask, Tonawanda Community House, Tonawanda, New York. Photographed in 1940.
- Born: Hayonhwonhish; September 16, 1889; Cattaraugus Reservation, NY
- Died: March 18, 1957 (aged 67); Genesee, NY
- Citizenship: American
- Occupations: Actor, Author, Artist, Craftsman, Keeper of Seneca Culture
- Relatives: Father Edward Cornplanter (Seneca name Sosondowah); Mother Nancy Jack
- Writing career
- Subjects: Seneca life, culture, and religion
- Notable works: Legends of the Longhouse, Iroquois Indian Games and Dances, collection SC12845 at the New York State Library, illustrated The Code of Handsome Lake
- Movement: Iroquois Realism

Jesse J. Cornplanter (September 16, 1889 – March 18, 1957) was an actor, artist, author, craftsman, Seneca Faithkeeper, and decorated veteran of World War I. The last male descendant of Cornplanter, an important 18th-century Haudenosaunee leader and war chief, his Seneca name was Hayonhwonhish (He Strokes the Rushes). He illustrated several books about Seneca and Haudenosaunee life. Jesse Cornplanter wrote and illustrated Legends of the Longhouse (1938), which records many Haudenosaunee traditional stories. Cornplanter was also the first Native American to play a lead in a feature film titled Hiawatha, which was released in 1913 and a year before the notable Western The Squaw Man.

== Personal ==
Jesse Cornplanter was born in 1889 to Seneca parents Nancy Jack and Edward Cornplanter on the Cattaraugus Reservation in New York. His mother was of the Snipe Clan of the Tonawanda and the matrilineal traditions of the tribe passed the Snipe Clan designation to the children. He had six sisters and three brothers, but because of childhood diseases, only two of his sisters survived, Carrie and Anna, until 1918 when Carrie perished. He was the last male direct descendant of Cornplanter, a renowned Seneca war chief during and after the American Revolutionary War.

Although his formal education never progressed past the third grade, his knowledge of Seneca customs, songs and rituals made him a popular resource on Seneca information, sought both from within and also outside the tribe.

During World War I, Cornplanter enlisted in the U.S. Army in 1917 and served in Europe until honorably discharged in 1919. He was wounded during the war and received the Purple Heart. While he was serving in the war, his father died. This was followed by the deaths of most of his remaining family in the 1918 flu pandemic, including his mother Nancy, sister Carrie, and nieces and nephews. Only his sister Anna and two orphaned children of Carrie survived. Cornplanter helped support and rear the surviving children upon his return from Europe.

After the war, Cornplanter held many respected positions within his tribe. These included the ceremonial chief of the Long House and the chief of New Town, a traditional village. He sang for the Great Feather Dancer and was head singer for many ceremonies.

Cornplanter was married to Elsina Billy (Seneca name Yoweh'sonh) of the Beaver Clan of the Tonawanda.

Because Jesse Cornplanter left no heirs, his death in 1957 marked the official expiration of a treaty granting Cornplanter's heirs a perpetual Pennsylvania land grant, called the Cornplanter Tract, of about 1500 acres along the Allegheny River. Much of this land was submerged by the Allegheny Reservoir after completion of the Kinzua Dam in 1965. The US Army Corps of Engineers acquired the land and built the dam for flood control, hydropower and recreation. This was in addition to 10,000 acres along the Allegheny River the COE took by right of eminent domain from the Seneca Nation.

== Actor ==
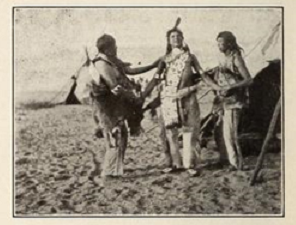
Jesse Cornplanter (center): silent film Hiawatha (1913)

In 1906, Cornplanter accompanied his father Edward, acting and singing in the Hiawatha pageant for many months. His travels with the troop also took him to England and Europe where his performances were favorably noted.

He also played the part of Hiawatha in Frank E. Moore's silent film Hiawatha, released in 1913. The feature film is stated to be the first to include Native Americans in the cast, and was looked upon favorably when compared to other contemporary Hollywood films portraying Native Americans. Moving Picture News called Cornplanter, "a real matinee idol."

== Artwork ==
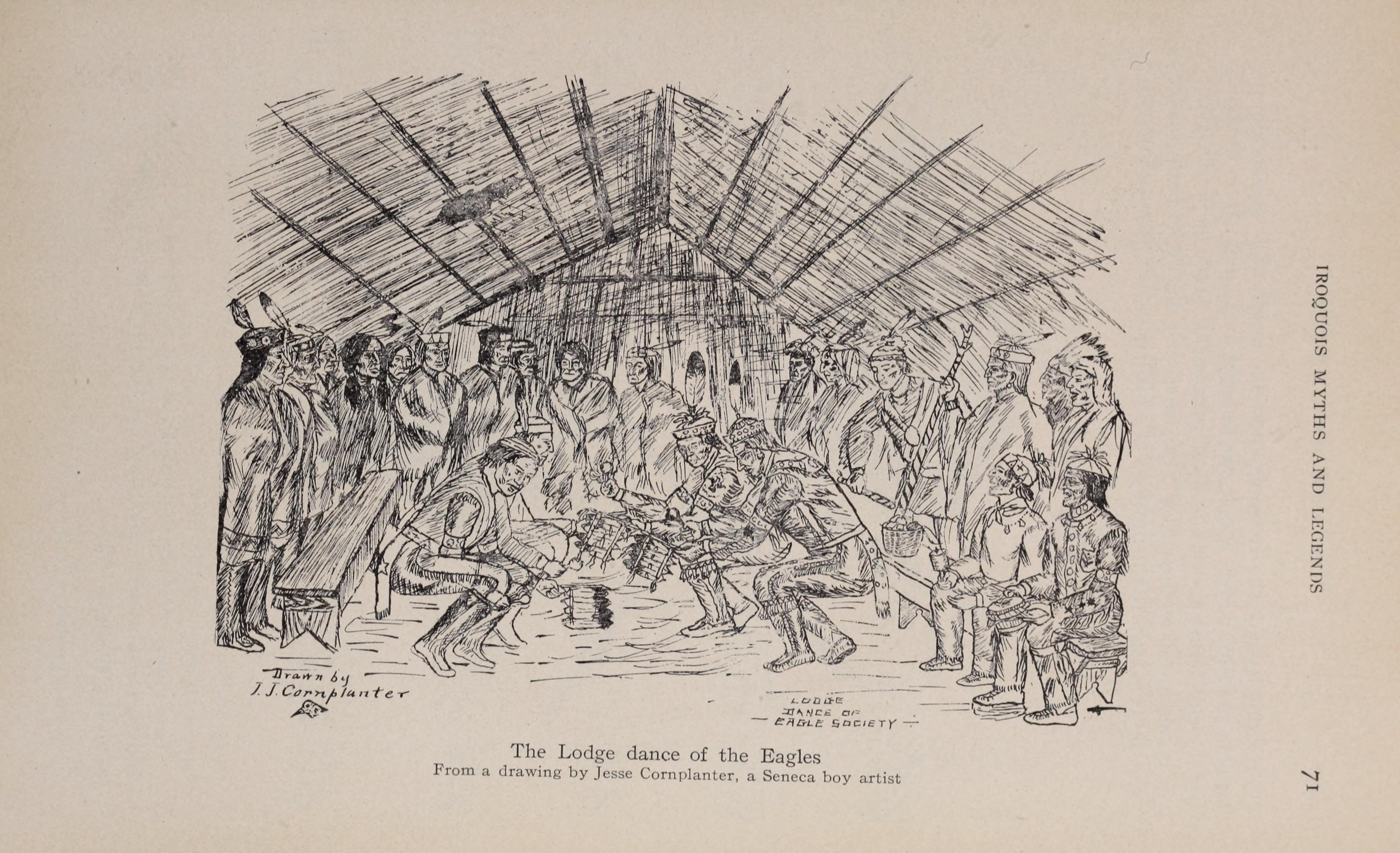
"The Lodge dance of the Eagles" by Cornplanter

When Cornplanter was only in his teens, he was already gaining recognition for his skillful portrayals of his tribe. He never received formal art training, but became successful as an artist.

Arthur C. Parker (Seneca), later Director of the Rochester Museum, commissioned Cornplanter as a youth to sketch scenes of contemporary Seneca life. This launched an eight-year collaboration between the two starting in 1901. Forty-six of Cornplanter's drawings are in collection SC12845 at the New York State Library.

Frederick Starr commissioned Cornplanter to illustrate Iroquois Indian Games and Dances (c. 1903), a book of sketches depicting rituals, dances and games of Haudenosaunee life. The young artist was credited as illustrator on the book's cover as "Jesse Cornplanter, Seneca Indian Boy". In selecting the 12 year old Cornplanter for the commission, Starr recognized the talent of the artist in showing, "firmness of line, boldness, and good skill in grouping" in his drawings. The proceeds from sales of Jesse's illustrations were used to produce and award the Cornplanter Medal every two years to a person best contributing to the research and knowledge of the Iroquois.

He illustrated The Code of Handsome Lake, a manuscript collaborated between his father, Edward Cornplanter (Seneca name Sosondowah), and Arthur C. Parker.

Cornplanter also wrote and illustrated his own book, Legends of the Longhouse, published in 1938.

His paintings are considered to be in the Iroquois Realist Style. This tradition dates to the 1820s work by brothers, David and Dennis Cusick (Tuscarora).

Although best known for his illustrations, Cornplanter was also a traditional wood carver. He greatly influenced successive generations of Haudenosaunee artists.

== Bibliography ==
- Cornplanter, Jesse J. (Of The Senecas), Told To Sah-Nee-Weh, Legends of the Longhouse. Philadelphia: J. B. Lippincott, 1938.

== See also ==
- List of Native American artists
- Visual arts by indigenous peoples of the Americas

== Notes ==
- Matthew, Dennis (2012). Early American Studies: Sencea Possessed: Indians, Witchcraft, and Power in the Early American Republic. University of Pennsylvania Press.
- Davis, Mary (1996). Native American in the twentieth Century.
