= G. Peter Jemison =

Native American artist, curator, and educator from New York

G. Peter Jemison HDFA
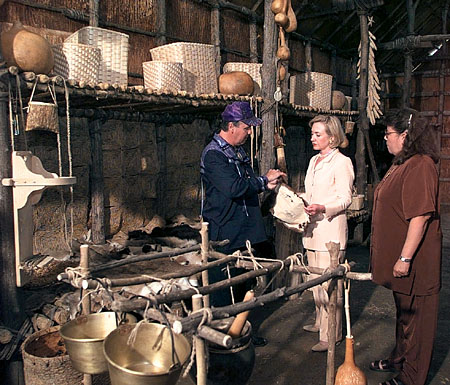
- G. Peter Jemison with then First Lady Hillary Clinton and Jeanette Miller, inside the Bark Long House at Ganondagan State Historic Site, 1998
- Born: Gerald Peter Jemison; 1945 (age 80–81); Silver Creek, New York
- Citizenship: Seneca Nation of Indians and American
- Education: University of Siena
- Alma mater: Buffalo State College, BS
- Known for: visual arts, curation, repatriation

G. Peter Jemison (born 1945) is a Native American artist, curator, educator, and author. He is a citizen of the Seneca Nation of Indians.

He is the founding curator of the American Indian Community House Gallery in New York City. Jemison's artwork is held in major metropolitan museums including the Metropolitan Museum of Art in New York and the British Museum in London.

He created a unique series using Haudenosaunee imagery and designs on paper bags. Jemison gained early success by showing his art to Tibor De Nagy, a prominent Manhattan gallerist. After fast success in his career, he then looked inward to find inspiration in his Seneca roots.

== Biography ==
G. Peter Jemison was born in 1945 in Silver Creek, New York. Jemison is a citizen of the Seneca Nation of Indians and belongs to the Heron clan. His parents are Seneca people, but his unique surname comes from a Scots-Irish captive who decided to stay with the Seneca.

== Education ==
Jemison studied fine arts at the University of Siena in Italy. He then went on to earn his Bachelor's of Science degree in art education from the Buffalo State College in 1967. He would also be awarded an Honorary Doctorate of Fine Arts from the same college in 2003.

== Career ==
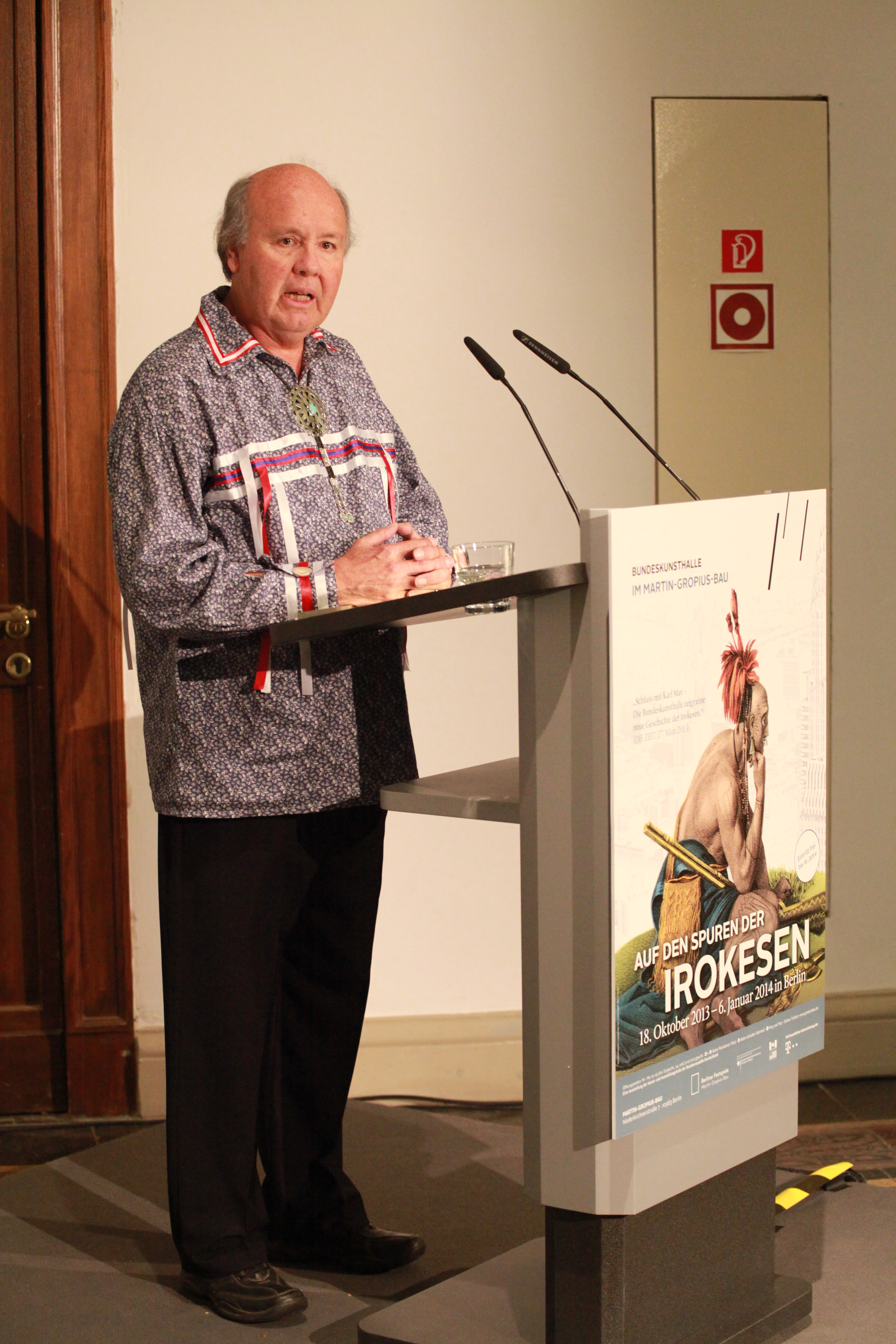
G. Peter Jemison 2013 in Germany at the opening of the "Irokesen" exhibition

Jemison is a mixed-media artist well known for his art on paper bags as well as an author. His work is representative of orenda which is a Haudenosaunee belief that everything has a spiritual force. Jemison has brought the Seneca traditions to a large audience with his art and use of materials. One of the canvases he works on the most is paper bags. He got this idea from his train commutes noticing that the one thing many people had in common was they would all be carrying bags. Jemison seen this commonality and decided to use it to talk on issues and traditions of the Native community. He is also a strong advocate for Native American rights and repatriation of sacred objects. He was the chairman of the Haudenosaunee burial rules and regulations that fights for the return of the sacred objects. Jemison also was a part of the restoration of Ganondaga which was a 17th-century Seneca village. This restoration included a replica Seneca longhouse, visitor center, and changing gallery.

== Artworks ==
Real Indian Land Claims, 2000. Collage and paint on bag. This work depicts a Native American in custody on the front and two Klan members on the back with an anti-native sign. The work was created as a response to land claims between natives and non-natives in New York in the 1980s.

- Sentinels (Large Yellow), 2006. Acrylic, oil, and collage on canvas. This work depicts dead sunflowers on a yellow patterned landscape. This work takes inspiration from Seneca bead work with the white and yellow patters around the sunflowers. The piece also refers back to Jemison's style of orenda work referencing the cycle of life and changing of the seasons.
- Ganondaga Autumn, 2022. Acrylic on canvas. This painting depicts a long house with the three sisters crops growing outside and different birds in the field. Work is representative of Jemison's heritage and works with familiar images like the birds and sunflowers that show up in other works.

== Select exhibitions ==
=== Solo exhibitions ===
Jemison has had a solo exhibition called Orenda, at K Art in New York in 2021 and a solo booth in The Armory Show in 2023.

=== Group exhibitions ===
He has also participated in group exhibitions that include Greater New York, 2021 and Just Above Midtown, 2022 at the Museum of Modern Art as well as Shared Light: G. Peter Jemison and Charles E. Burchfield, 2022 at Burchfield Penney Art Center.

== Collections ==
Jemison artworks can be found in several major museum collections including the Burchfield Penney Art Center, Museum of Modern Art New York, National Gallery of Art, Whitney Museum of American Art, Nasher Museum of Art, Heard Museum, Institute of American Indian Arts Museum, Denver Art Museum, and internationally at the British Museum in London and at the Museum der Weltkultern in Germany.

== Authored works ==
Jemison, G. Peter. Haudenosaunee Artists: A Common Heritage : Contemporary Native American Art in Conjunction [i.e. Conjunction] with the Native American Festival, February 26-March 27, 1992. SUNY College at Brockport, Tower Fine Arts Gallery, 1992.

Jemison, G. Peter. “A Mohawk Village at the New York State Museum.” Curator (New York, N.Y.), vol. 36, no. 4, 1993, pp. 314–17.

== Awards ==
In 2023 Jemison was awarded the Johnson Fellowship for Artists Transforming Communities

== Bibliography ==
- Battaglia, A. (2023). G. PETER JEMISON. In Art in America (1939) (Vol. 111, Issue 4, pp. 80-). Brant Publications, Incorporated.
- “K ART Announces Two New Exhibitions: ‘Brought to Light: The Epidemic of Violence against Native and Indigenous Women’ AND ‘Orenda: Paintings by Artist G. Peter Jemison.’” PR Newswire, PR Newswire Association LLC, 2021.
- Smith, Matthew Ryan. “Seneca Painter: G. PETER JEMISON.” First American Art Magazine, no. 29, First American Art Magazine LLC, 2021, pp. 66-.
- From Issue: Summer 2020 / Vol. 21 No. 2, et al. “The Way Back Home: The Journeys of Seneca ‘Culture Worker’ Peter Jemison.” NMAI Magazine
- Artists | Moma,
- “G. Peter Jemison.” G. Peter Jemison - Burchfield Penney Art Center,
- Reynolds, Emily. “Hidden Territories.” Cornelia Magazine, Cornelia Magazine, 22 Jan. 2024,
- “G. Peter Jemison, Halley's Cardinal Comet.” Nasher Museum of Art at Duke University, 22 Nov. 2022
- “Artist Collection.” ArtsWA, 19 June 2019
- Jemison, G. Peter. Haudenosaunee Artists: A Common Heritage : Contemporary Native American Art in Conjunction [i.e. Conjunction] with the Native American Festival, February 26-March 27, 1992. SUNY College at Brockport, Tower Fine Arts Gallery, 1992.
- Jemison, G. Peter. “A Mohawk Village at the New York State Museum.” Curator (New York, N.Y.), vol. 36, no. 4, 1993, pp. 314–17.
