= Cumming Nature Center =

Environmental education facility in New York, US

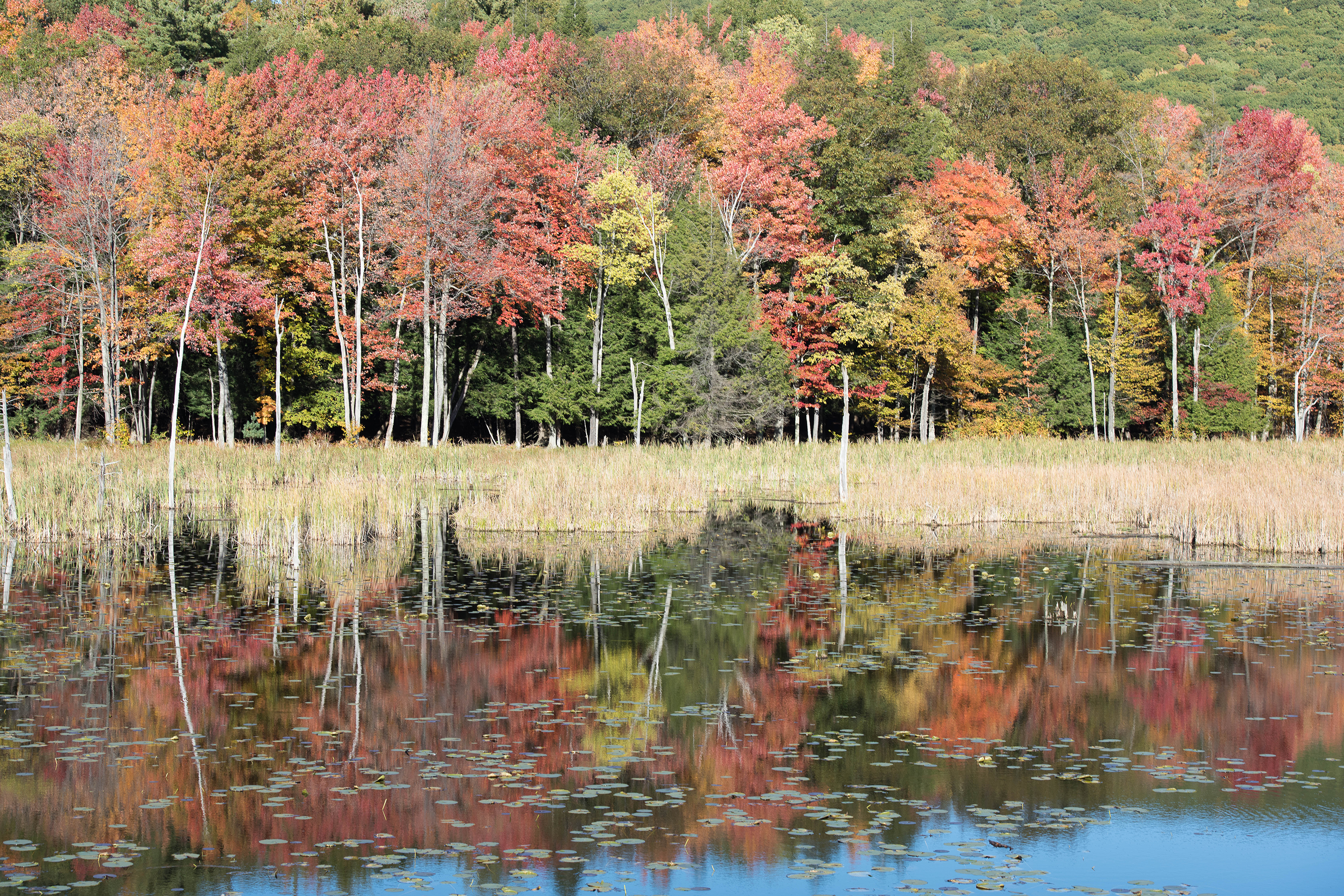
- Cumming Nature Center in the fall
- Interactive map of Cumming Nature Center
- Type: Environmental education center
- Location: 6472 Gulick Rd; Naples, New York
- Coordinates: 42°42′21″N 77°27′20″W
- Area: 900 acres (360 ha)
- Operator: Rochester Museum and Science Center
- Hiking trails: 15 miles
- Website: www.rmsc.org/cumming-nature-center

The Cumming Nature Center (CNC) is a 900-acre environmental education facility located near Naples, New York. Owned by the Rochester Museum & Science Center (RMSC), the preserve features over fifteen miles of trails and offers educational programs and service-learning opportunities. Established in 1973 with a gift from the Cumming family to the Rochester Museum & Science Center, CNC's landscape is home to a diverse variety of habitats, including abandoned fields, conifer plantations, swamps, marshes, ponds, and upland forests. Visitors can also explore a Visitor Center featuring a variety of educational exhibits, interactive play areas, and classroom space.

== Trails ==
Visitors can access the nature center landscape through 15 miles of trails that showcase a variety of wetlands, meadows, and forests. Trail highlights include a beaver pond observation tower, several interpretive trails, and an iconic red pine stand. CNC has five themed trails to explore.

- The Beaver Trail offers a first-hand example of an animal's interaction with its environment. Visitors see forest, stream, marsh, and meadow habitats rich with plant and animal life along the way to an observation tower overlooking a 35-acre beaver pond.
- The Helen Gordon Trail features an outdoor art gallery focused on the birds and other animals in the area.
- The Haudenosaunee Trail features paintings by Seneca artist Ernest Smith about the culture and tradition of the Haudenosaunee.
- The Pioneer Trail includes a reconstructed 18th-century homestead and interpretive signs that teach about the lives of early settlers.
- The Conservation Trail helps visitors learn about the nature center’s forest conservation and management practices.

During the winter, visitors can use 12 miles of groomed ski trails and 3 miles of snowshoe trails. Ski and snowshoe rentals are available.

== Programs ==
CNC offers year-round guided hikes and other programming to help visitors engage with the complex relationship between humans and the natural world. Educational programs are designed to inspire innovative and creative thinking among participants and provide them with the tools, knowledge, and confidence to actively steward the local landscape in the face of local, regional, and global challenges. From moonlit hikes to archaeological digs, visitors can learn about the Finger Lakes region and the interactions that have shaped it over thousands of years.

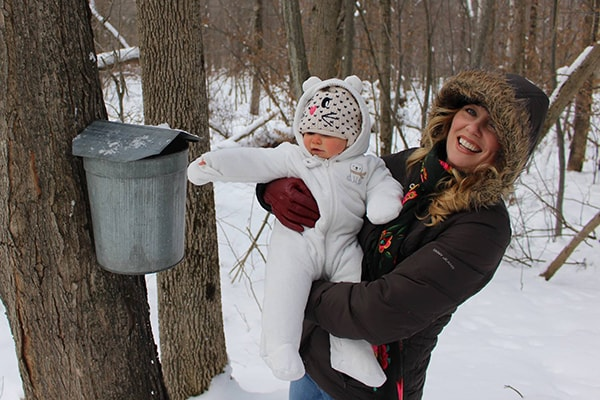
The maple sugaring event is for all ages.

Annual events:

- NordicFest: Celebrates winter sport and raises money for the Genesee Valley Nordic Ski Patrol.
- Maple Sugaring Weekends: Each year for over 40 years, the Nature Center has held a maple sugaring event as a fundraiser. Visitors learn about the history of tapping maples in Western New York, the process of converting sap into maple syrup, and enjoy a locally sourced pancake breakfast.
- Frost Town Trail Fest: 10k and 25k trail running event.
- FLX Fermentation Fest: explores the art of fermentation through food and drink, showcasing the abundance of the Finger Lakes region.
- Family Archaeology Weekend: a public outreach event held in collaboration with SUNY Brockport's Department of Anthropology. Participants help excavate a 19th-century homestead.
- Heritage Maker Workshops: workshops include blacksmithing, basket-weaving, spoon-carving, and more.

== Forest School ==
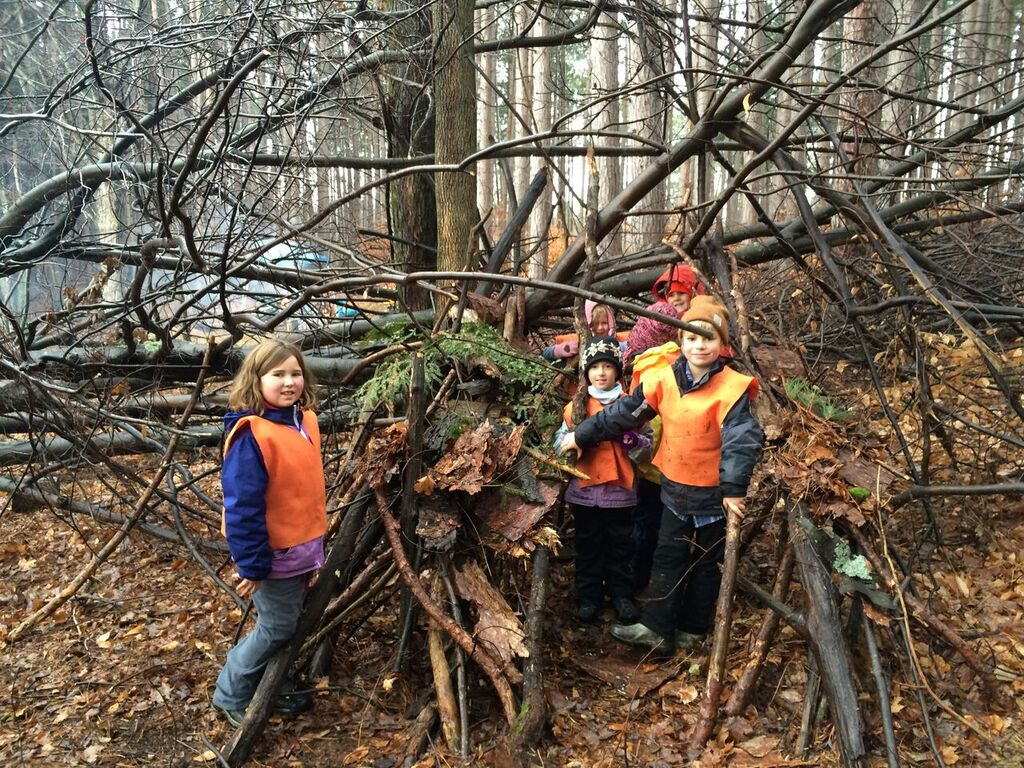
Children learn about and connect with nature at the Forest School.

CNC offers a suite of Forest School programs for children from early childhood through middle school. A forest school is defined by the Forest School Association as "an inspirational process, that offers learners regular opportunities to achieve and develop confidence and self-esteem through hands-on learning experiences in a woodland or natural environment with trees." CNC's Forest School programs engage children through unstructured play, curiosity-driven exploratory learning, hands-on science projects, and outdoor skills development.

== The Walden Project - NY ==
The Walden Project is a year-long educational program for high school and gap-year students inspired by the life and writings of Henry David Thoreau. The Walden Project provides students aged 14–19 with an interdisciplinary education in an outdoor setting with an emphasis on academic independence and freedom.
