= Dennis Cusick =

Native American painter

- Born: c. 1800; New York, US
- Died: 1824; New York, US
- Education: Self-taught
- Known for: Painting
- Movement: Iroquois Realist Movement

Dennis Cusick (c. 1800–1824) was a Tuscarora painter from New York and one of the founders of the Iroquois Realist Style of painting.

== Biography ==
Dennis Cusick was born c. 1800 to the Tuscarora nation, one of the Six Nations of the Haudenosaunee Confederacy. His father was Nicholas Cusick (1758–1840), a Revolutionary War veteran who had fought with the Indian Rangers. The family lived in Oneida County, New York, but moved to Niagara County, New York, when Nicholas was hired to be an interpreter and assistant to the local missions to the Tuscarora. A missionary, Elkanah Holmes, wrote that Nicholas promised "to collect materials for making up an account of the present state of the Indians, as well as for a history of the ancient tribes inhabiting the state."

This interest in documenting the lifeways and history of area tribes must have influenced his sons, particularly Dennis' older brother, David Cusick, who wrote and illustrated Sketches of Ancient History of the Six Nations in 1828.

In January 1818, Dennis joined the Tuscarora Congregational Church. He painted two watercolors to decorate collection boxes for the church. The Congregationalist mission supported a school on the Seneca Reservation at Buffalo Creek, New York.

Dennis died at the age of twenty-four.

== Artwork ==
James Young, a teacher at the Buffalo Creek school, wrote about Dennis, "in acquiring the arts he has had no instruction except what he has received from copying." Dennis was praised by another teacher, who said he "could draw well, and made his own colors from native woods." He was also praised for his skill in calligraphy, which appears in his paintings. In Cusick's art, the fusion of Native and Euro-American motifs provides an authentic visual chronicle of the material changes in Native culture that resulted from the absorption of Christian values and themes.

Two almost identical watercolor paintings were painted by Dennis to adorn collection boxes. "Seneca School House" is dated July 3, 1821, and "Seneca Mission House" is dated April 16, 1822. They both feature the two-storey, log schoolhouse, both with a pitched roof, smoking chimney, and bell tower. To the left is a crowd of traditionally dressed Tuscarora warriors and boys. Tall trees flank the sides of the paintings and birds fly overhead. The later painting is precisely composed and more orderly overall.

A pair of 1821 watercolors features schoolchildren in class. "Seneca School House. July 16, 1821" portrays James Young teaching a crowd of Tuscarora boys. Books, desks, and windows dot the room. Dennis' flair for calligraphy in almost uncanny in its precision, as showcased in Biblical quotes, examples of script on a chalkboard, and minute vocabulary lessons in three languages, pinned on the walls. The gustoweh headdresses that adorn the older boys' heads indicate a continued Haudenosaunee identity.

"Seneca Mission House, Nov. 15, 1821" features girls studying in Mrs. James Young's class. Quotes about the nature of work hover over a scene of Tuscarora girls, busy as a variety of spinning wheels, overseen by an elaborately coiffed Mrs. Young at the paintings' left.

Two of Dennis' other paintings survive. Dated March 4, 1822, "Evening Psalm" is a watercolor on paper, signed by the artist. The painting features two Tuscarora warriors – one standing with a bow, the other seated with two firearms – and a Tuscarora woman with a baby resting on her shoulder, tucked inside her robe. The three are flanked by loose, painterly foliage, and a dense tree, in which Dennis scraped the paint away to produce highlights. The background is filled with undulating blue hills, lined with evergreen trees. The narrow slice of sky is filled with a variety of cloud formations, and a minute sun tucked in the far left corner. Details of the figures' faces are minimal. Dennis relies on outlining to define shapes and cross-hatching to provide shadows and mass. Above the scene, the artist wrote a psalm in Seneca and English.

The last painting, "Christening of the Tuscarora Asa Thompson," is unsigned but dated 1821. Attribution is based on style and documentation that accompanied the painting. The watercolor painting features a Tuscarora woman handing her baby to an Haudenosaunee man, wearing a fingerwoven sash, leggings, and moccasins. To his right in the minister, holding a Bible and extending his right hand. Both men have top hats. The background foliage is even more whimsical than that of "Evening Psalm." Swaying trees cover rolling hills around the edges of the scene, but the center of the painting has large unpainted, negative space, providing contrast the figures.

== Legacy ==
Dennis was one of the Early Iroquois Realists, who included at least five other painters, David Cusick, Thomas Jacobs (either a Tuscarora or Seneca), and anonymous artists of the Cattaraugus Seneca and Oneida tribes. They are known today only by twenty-five surviving paintings. Their work was a departure from previous Haudenosaunee art forms and paved the way for Native Americans to use new materials from the global community to express their contemporary realities. Jesse Cornplanter (Seneca) carried on the realist tradition in the early 20th century.
