= Faithkeeper =

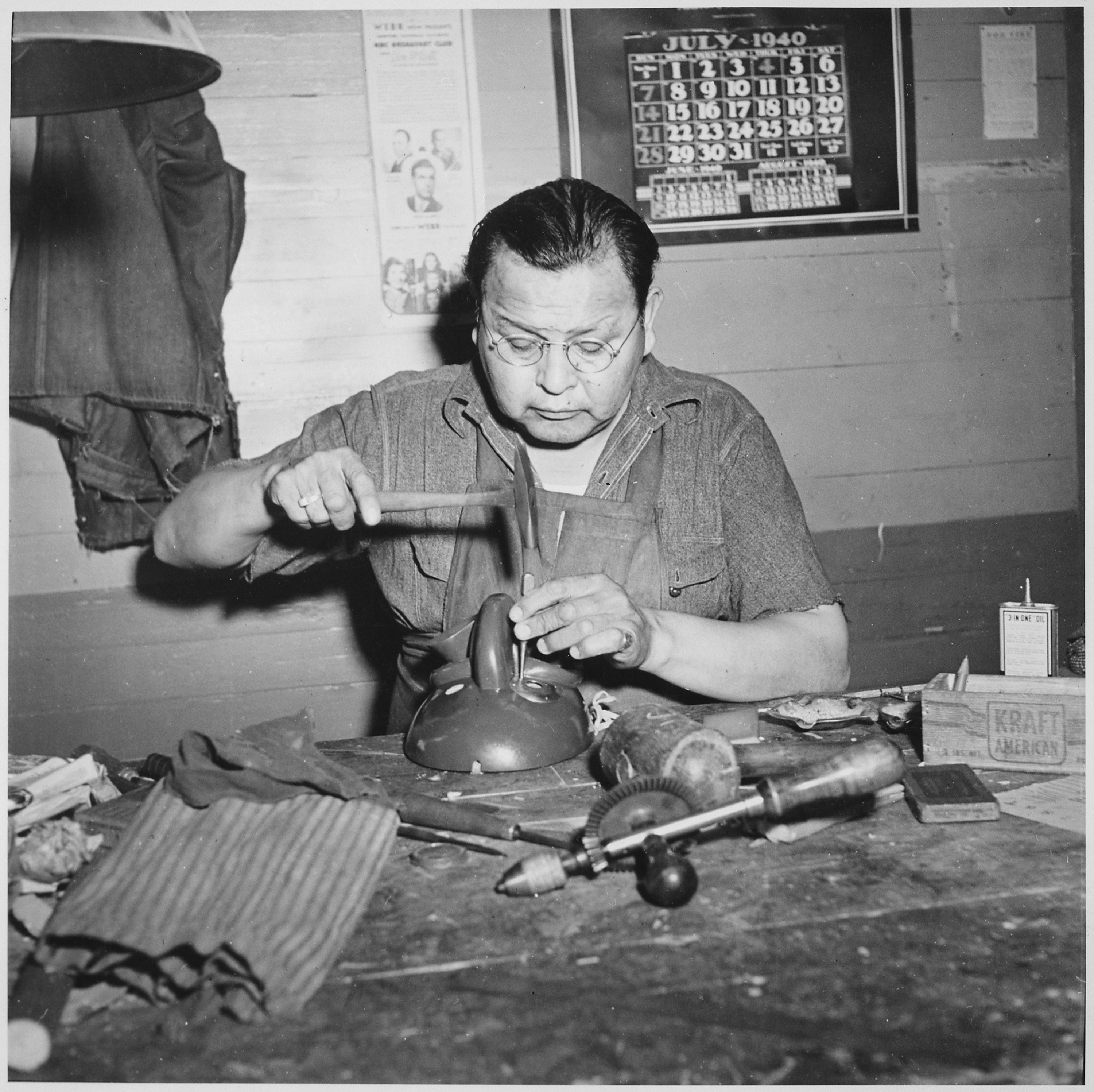
Jesse Cornplanter or Hayonhwonhish, Tonawanda Seneca faithkeeper, making a ceremonial mask

Faithkeeper or Faith Keeper (Note: Mohawk: Kaié:ri niioríwake Iakoteríhonton (female), Kaié:ri niioríwake Roterihonton (male); pl. Oneida: lonatlihu·tú; Onondaga: godi·hų́·daʼ (female), hodi·hų́·daʼ (male) or adi·hųdaʼtshä·ʼ; Cayuga: godríhǫ:t (female), hodríhǫ:t (male); Seneca: Godí:ön (female), Hodí:ön (male)) is an office in the traditional government of the Haudenosaunee Confederacy. Each Clan Mother has two Faith Keepers, one male relative and one female relative, acting under them as spiritual advisors and as repositories of traditional knowledge and language.

== Role ==
Faithkeepers are bridges between traditional Indigenous knowledge and the modern world. Faithkeepers promote traditional Haudenosaunee ways and uphold Haudenosaunee culture and languages. They support the spirituality of their Clan and serve as spiritual advisors and deputies to the Rotiyanehson and Clan Mothers. Faithkeepers are organizational leaders within longhouses and prepare them for rituals and other gatherings. A central role of the Faithkeepers is maintaining the Four Sacred Rituals offering thanks to the Creator: the Great Feather Dance, Men's Chant, Water Drum Dance, and the Peachstone Game.

== Notable Haudenosaunee Faithkeepers ==
- Jesse Cornplanter (Hayonhwonhish, 1889-1957)
- Oren Lyons (Joagquisho, born 1930)
