= 1911 New York State Capitol fire =

Fire in Albany, NY

Coordinates: 42.652553°N 73.757323°W

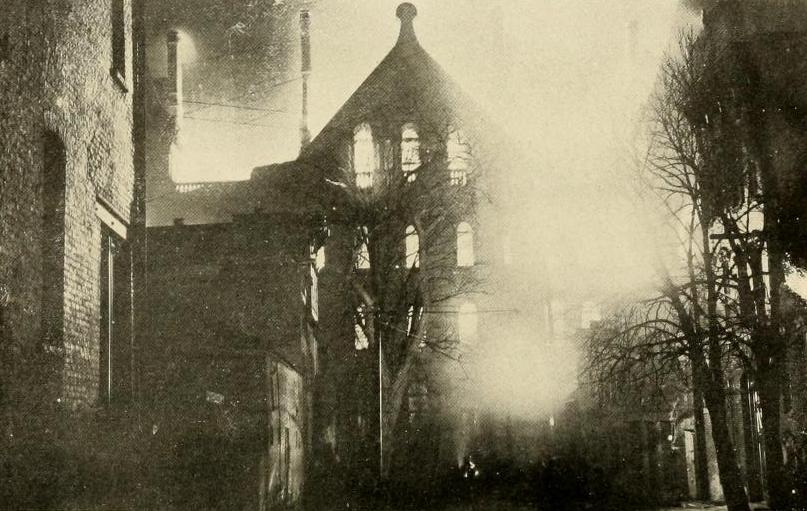
The Capitol on fire in 1911

On the morning of March 29, 1911, a fire destroyed substantial portions of the New York State Capitol, including vast holdings of the New York State Library and the New York State Museum. It destroyed or damaged hundreds of thousands of documents and books. There was one casualty, Samuel Abbott, a watchman.

== Background ==
The New York State Capitol building was constructed from 1867 to 1899. It took 32 years to complete. The New York State Library and New York State Museum were held on the upper floors of the building. Other governmental offices were also held in the complex, including legislative chambers and the offices of politicians such as the Governor of New York.

In New York City the Triangle Shirtwaist Factory fire on March 25, 1911, had killed 146 people.

== Fire ==
The fire began around 2:10 a.m. on the morning of March 29, 1911. The fire's cause is unknown, but it may have been started by electrical wiring or the butt of a cigar dropped onto the floor.

Originating in the library for the New York State Assembly on the third-floor, the fire spread across the floor and up to the two floors above it. Damage was concentrated on the northwestern side and lower floors were largely untouched, with damage predominantly from water or smoke. The Albany Fire Department was alerted to the fire about thirty minutes later, at 2:42 a.m., when Fire Box 324 was pulled by Dwight Goewey.

125 firefighters and thirteen horse-drawn vehicles responded. Ten of the vehicles were 'streamers' and three were ladders. Samuel Abbott, a watchman, was killed in the fire, the only casualty. Elk Street, Washington Avenue, and State Street were evacuated. Thousands watched the conflagration and police had to be deployed to control the fire. Joseph Gavit, an employee of the library at the time, later wrote:

“Efforts … had been made for some years to secure adequate fire protection in the library quarters. But all to no result. The Capitol burn? It was fireproof! It proved to be fireproof just like a furnace — what is in it will burn.”

During the fire, the archaeologist Arthur C. Parker used a Seneca tomahawk to smash display cases and try to save Iroquois artifacts from the building. He was successful in saving 50 out of around 500.

== Aftermath ==
The fire is locally known as "The Great Fire of 1911". After it was put out, people quickly began hunting for souvenirs and the New York State National Guard was deployed to protect the area. The fire, which happened four days after the Triangle Shirtwaist Factory fire, has been described as a "one-two punch" that led to fire safety reform in New York.

Almost the library's whole collection, at the time 800,000 items, was destroyed, leaving what The Daily Gazette described as a "hole in [New York's] cultural heritage". At least 725,000 documents were destroyed and many more were damaged, such as the 1657 Flushing Remonstrance. Some prominent items escaped the fire. A draft of the Emancipation Proclamation and George Washington's Farewell Address were held in a fireproof safe. A copy of the Memoirs of Sir Joshua Reynolds that the library had held since 1819 was not burnt because it was loaned out. The book was not returned to the library until 1967. NBC reported that just 7,000 books and 80,000 manuscripts survived and that 500,000 books and 300,000 manuscripts were destroyed. The New York Museum also lost 8,500 artifacts. Condolences for the loss came in from around the world; a librarian at the Imperial University of Tokyo wrote: "I beg to express my deepest sympathy for the loss of the New York State Library by the recent fire."

== Legacy ==
John Dix, at the time New York's governor, reportedly worked in the building the day after the fire. The state library was held at the New York State Education Building after the fire to 1978. A year after the fire work began on a Legislative Library to replace that which had burned. From March 19, 2011, to August 15, 2011, the New York State Museum had an exhibition on the fire, as did the New York State Library in March and April.
