= David Cusick =

Native American writer and painter

- Born: c. 1780
- Died: c. 1831 or 1840
- Education: Self-taught
- Known for: Engraving, illustration, painting
- Movement: Iroquois Realist Movement

David Cusick (c. 1780 – 1840) was a Tuscarora artist and the author of David Cusick's Sketches of Ancient History of the Six Nations (1827). This is an early (if not the first) account of Native American history and myth, written and published in English by a Native American. He was the leading figure of the Iroquois Realist Movement.

== Biography ==
Cusick was born between 1780 and 1785, probably on Oneida land in upstate New York. He was Tuscarora. His father, Nicholas Cusick (1756–1840), was a Revolutionary War veteran and an interpreter for the Congregationalist mission to the Seneca. He most likely attended a mission school where he learned to read and write English. David's younger brother, Dennis Cusick, was a watercolor painter, and together the two brothers help establish what the critic William C. Sturvetant has called the Iroquois realist school of painting. David served in the War of 1812, during which his village was burned by the British.

He was a physician, painter, and student of Haudenosaunee (Iroquois) oral tradition. He is thought to have died around 1840.

== Book ==
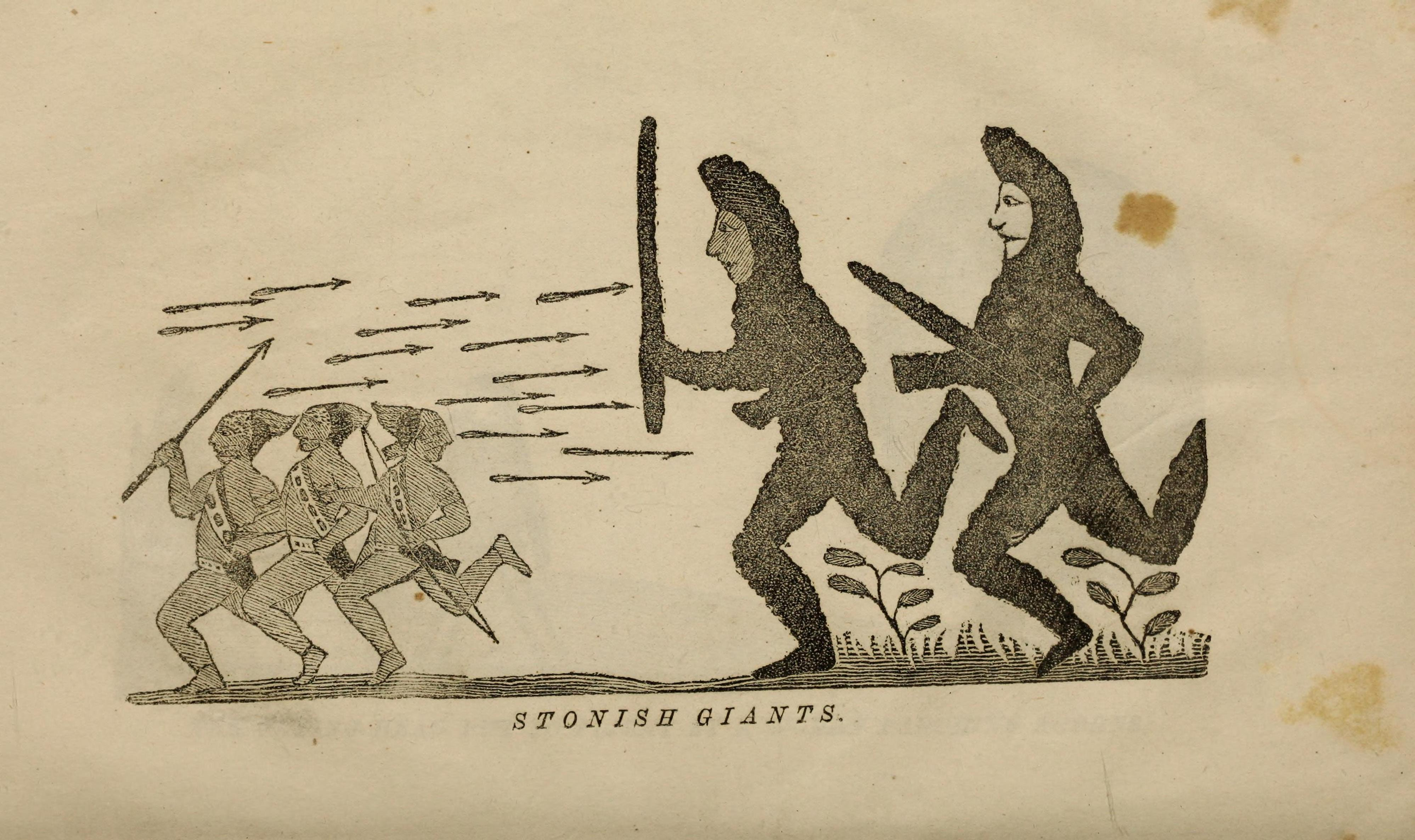
Stonish Giants, engraving by David Cusick from Sketches of the Ancient History of the Six Nations

Sketches of Ancient History of the Six Nations "was the first Native-authored, Native-printed, and Native-copyrighted text" in what is now the United States; Cusick published the first edition of Sketches as a 28-page pamphlet at Lewiston, New York, in 1825 or 1827. He re-issued it the following year with additional text and four of his own engravings. The Sketches was republished in 1848 and again in 1892. Cusick printed at least some editions with his own money. Sketches was a source for several 19th-century works on Iroquois oral tradition.

Sketches describes about 2,800 years of history. It is divided into three parts. The first part describes Good Mind, who created people called Eagwehoewe. The second describes the Eagwehoewe's experiences with malevolent beings called the Stonish Giants and Flying Heads, among others. Part three is about the Eagwehoewe's creation of a "chain of alliance" with one another.

The narrative begins by describing "two worlds" in existence among the "ancients": a dark "lower world" and an "upper world" inhabited by humans. The narrative describes the twin brothers Enigorio and Enigonhahetgea (the good spirit and evil spirit) and their creatures, the Eagwehoewe (the people) and their enemies the Ronnongwetowanca (giants). The earliest people were championed by the hero Donhtonha and the less heroic Yatatonwatea and plagued by the mischievous Shotyeronsgwea. Other characters include Big Quisquiss, the Big Elk, and the Lake Serpent.

Villains include Konearaunehneh (Flying Heads), the Lake Serpent, the Otneyarheh (Stonish Giants), the snake with the human head, the Oyalkquoher or Oyalquarkeror (the Big Bear), the great musqueto, Kaistowanea (the serpent with two heads), the great Lizard, and the witches introduced by the Skaunyatohatihawk or Nanticokes.

Early critics of Sketches, including Henry David Thoreau, Henry Schoolcraft, and Francis Parkman, dismissed the text. Critic Joshua David Bellin notes that, "considering how rare Sketches was—rare both in numbers and, as the first self-proclaimed history in English by a North American Indian, in kind—the attention, and hostility, it drew are little short of remarkable".

== See also ==
- List of Native American artists
- Visual arts by indigenous peoples of the Americas

== Sources ==
- Bellin, Joshua David (2001). The demon of the continent : Indians and the shaping of American literature. University of Pennsylvania Press. doi:10.9783/9780812201222. ISBN 978-0-8122-0122-2.
- Kalter, Susan (2002). "Finding a Place for David Cusick in Native American Literary History". MELUS. 27 (3): 9–42. doi:10.2307/3250653. JSTOR 3250653.
- Radus, D. M. (2014). "Printing Native History in David Cusick's Sketches of Ancient History of the Six Nations". American Literature. 86 (2): 217–243. doi:10.1215/00029831-2646910. ISSN 0002-9831.
- Round, Phillip H. (2010). Removable type : histories of the book in Indian country, 1663–1880. Chapel Hill: University of North Carolina Press. ISBN 978-0-8078-9947-2. OCLC 676700712.
- Sturvetant, William C. (2006). "Early Iroquois realist artists". American Indian Art Magazine. 31 (2): 44–55, 95. hdl:10088/31964. ISSN 0192-9968.
