= Rochester Museum and Science Center =

Museum in Rochester, New York, United States

Coordinates: 43°9′9.2″N 77°35′14.8″W

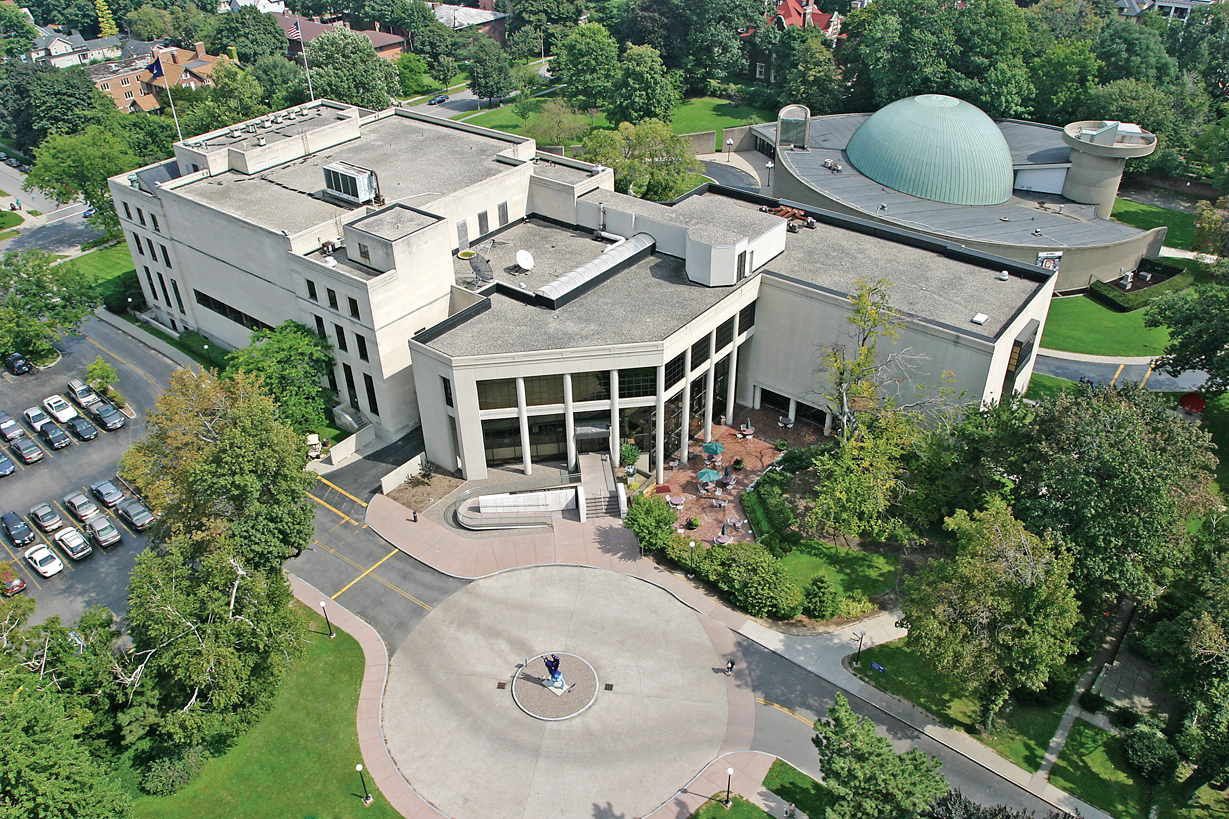
The RMSC campus as viewed from the outside

The Rochester Museum & Science Center (RMSC) is a prominent educational institution and regional tourist attraction in Rochester, New York. The RMSC offers hands-on community education in science, technology, regional history, and natural culture, it serves as a primary destination for families, student groups, and tourists in Western New York. The museum is located at 657 East Ave. and houses a collection of 1.2 million artifacts. The organization also operates the adjacent Strasenburgh Planetarium and the 850-acre Cumming Nature Center in Naples, New York.

== Museum exhibits ==
- Hodinöšyö:nih Continuity | Resilience | Innovation is about Hodinöšyö:nih culture of both past and present. It is also sometimes spelled Haudenosaunee.
- The Path We Share is an exhibit about the diversity of Indigenous American lifestyles as expressed through material culture and the environment.
- Wonders of Water exhibit is about the exploration of the waters of the Rochester region as a force of nature and source of life.
- Expedition Earth shows the Rochester area landscape and natural history from 540 million years ago to the present day.
- Electricity Theater is a science show that features a display of indoor bolts of musical lightning produced by twin solid-state Tesla coils.
- Flight to Freedom: Rochester’s Underground Railroad is about Abolitionists and Freedom Seekers
- Objectively Racist is how racist media influences people’s lives, and how people can use this imagery as an educational tool to promote social equity.
- Illumination: The World of Light and Optics is about applications of lasers and light
- Under Construction: A hands-on exploration of construction tools, machines, and materials.
- At the Western Door is the over 400 years of cooperation and conflict between Western New York’s native Haudenosaunee (Iroquois) inhabitants and Europeans.
- How Things Work is the science behind everyday devices and machines in this seasonal, hands-on, minds-on exhibit
- KEVA Planks brings out the designer, architect, and engineer in all of us.
- The Young Lion of the West shows how Rochester became America's first western "boomtown" due to the Erie Canal through this recreation of a section of the city in 1838.
- Changemakers is inspiring stories of past and present diverse Rochester, Indigenous, and Haudenosaunee women visionaries, trailblazers, inventors, activists, and entrepreneurs who changed Rochester and the world.

Outside of the museum, the Regional Green infrastructure Showcase teaches about the benefits of capturing and controlling stormwater runoff and green infrastructure in general.

The museum also hosts temporary and traveling exhibits. In past years, these have included Survival of the Slowest, Sean Kenney's Animal Super Powers: Made with LEGO Bricks, and Astronaut.

== History ==
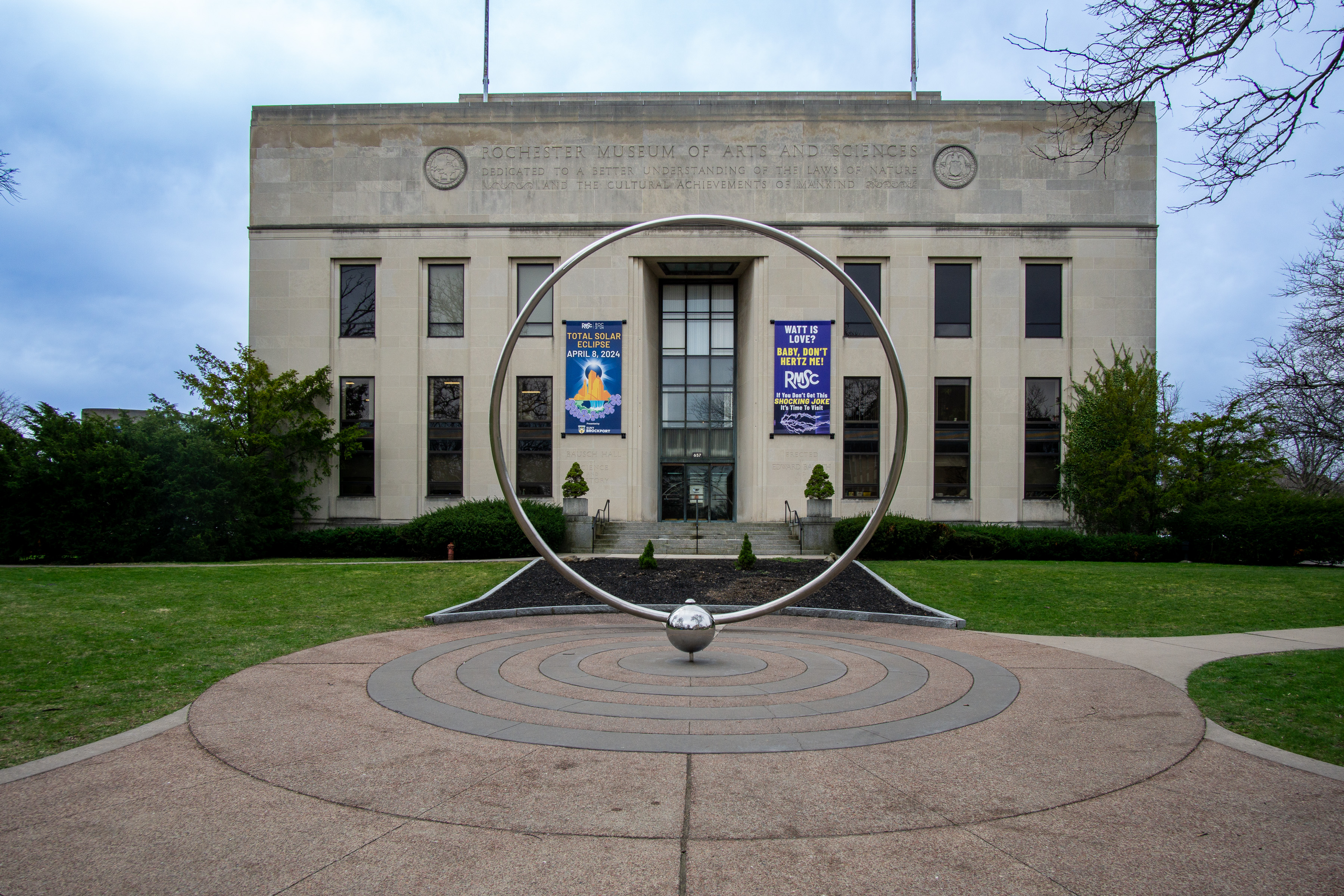
RMSC

The museum was established in 1912 as the Rochester Municipal Museum. Its first curator, Edward D. Putnam, served from 1913 until 1924, when New York archaeologist Arthur C. Parker took over as museum director. Parker began to expand the museum's holdings and research in anthropology, geology, biology, natural history, and the history and industry of the Genesee Region. He created the WPA-funded Indian Arts Project and is responsible for the construction of Bausch Hall.

In 1930, the name of the museum was changed to the Rochester Museum of Arts and Sciences.

W. Stephen Thomas, a trained museum professional from Philadelphia's Academy of Natural Sciences, succeeded Parker as museum director in 1945. Under his leadership, the museum saw the creation of state-of-the-art dioramas and growth of collections in history, technology, natural science, archaeology, and anthropology. Among the exhibits Thomas oversaw was a "pipe organ panorama" in the spring of 1955 that was visited by over 10,000 people.

Ian C. McLennan, former director of the Queen Elizabeth Planetarium in Edmonton, Alberta, Canada, was appointed as director of the creation of a planetarium in 1965 and followed Thomas as RMSC Executive Director from 1968 to 1972. 1968 saw the name of the museum change to its current title, the Rochester Museum & Science Center.

Richard C. Shultz took over as director from 1973 to 1996, and he oversaw the construction of the 400-set Eisenhart Auditorium and the Gannett School classroom building. He also established the Cumming Nature Center. Three capital campaigns provided the funding for the Elaine Wilson Hall in the museum, the giant-screen film system in the Strasenburgh Planetarium, improvements in collection storage and laboratories, and an increase in the endowment fund.

RMSC President Kate Bennett took the helm in 1996. Under her presidency, partnership projects with Monroe Boces 1 brought the Challenger Learning Center at the Strasenburgh Planetarium and the Bathysphere Underwater Biological Laboratory in the museum. The Genesee Community Charter School opened on the RMSC campus in 2001. The museum continues to create new galleries and new learning experiences for visitors. Bennet retired in 2018.

In late 2018, Hillary Olson, a native of the Rochester area, became the 7th President and CEO of the RMSC. Olson has a rich museum and planetarium background and has worked at the Franklin Institute Science Museum, the Milwaukee Public Museum and the Griffith Observatory and Planetarium.

The museum had a four-day festival for the solar eclipse of April 8, 2024 but the day was cloudy.

== Strasenburgh Planetarium ==
The Strasenburgh Planetarium, owned by RMSC, is located next to the museum. Open since 1968, the planetarium features star shows, giant-screen films and laser light shows under a four-story dome.

== Cumming Nature Center ==
The Cumming Nature Center, also owned by RMSC, is a 900-acre nature preserve near Naples, New York, dedicated to environmental education. It has over six miles of trails and offers educational programs and service opportunities.
