= Arthur C. Parker =

Native American museum director, archaeologist, and historian

- Ga:wasowa:nëh
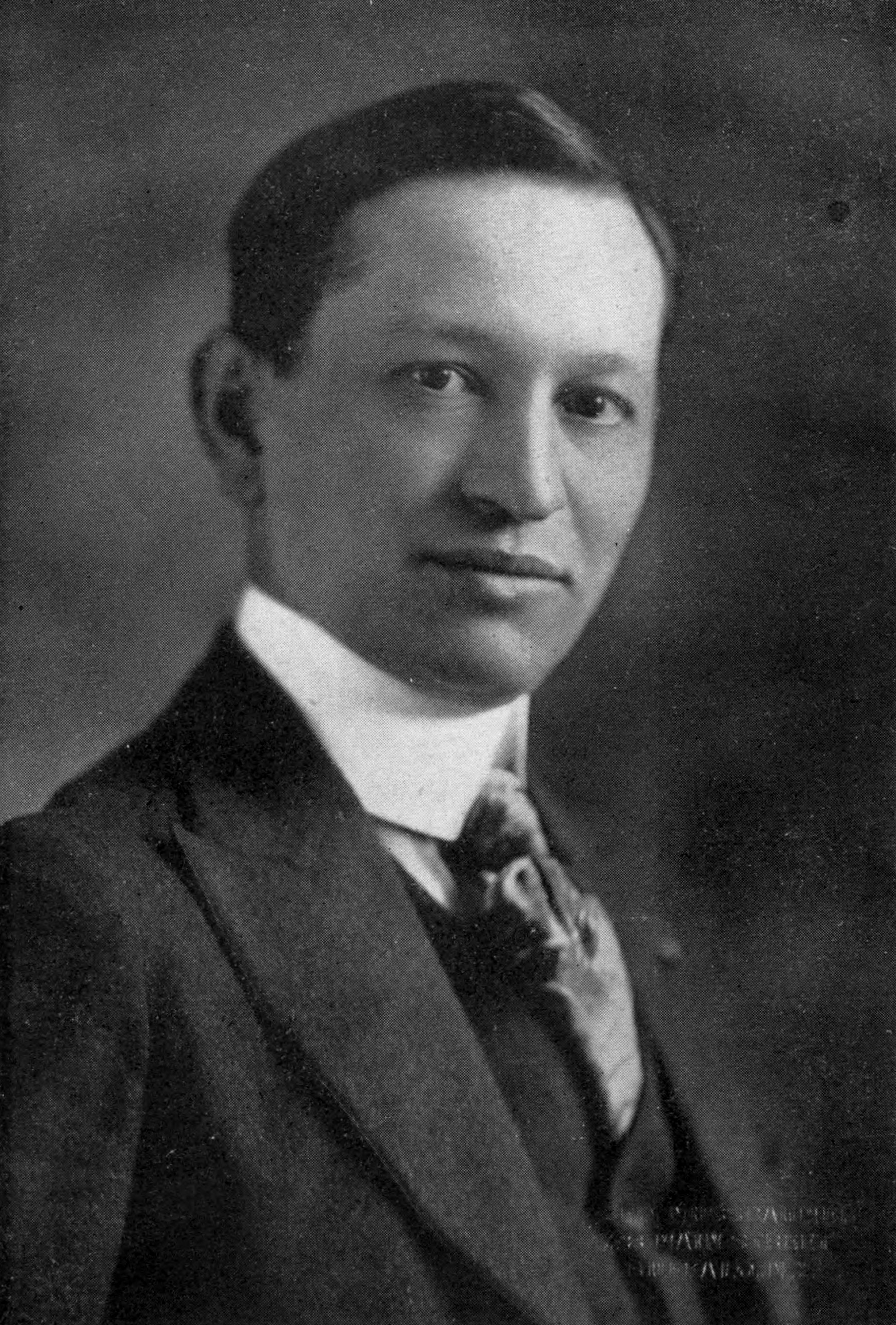
- Born: Arthur Caswell Parker; April 5, 1881; Cattaraugus Reservation, New York, U.S.
- Died: January 1, 1955 (aged 73); Nunda-wah-oh, near Naples, New York, U.S.
- Known for: Iroquois archaeology and ethnology; directing the Rochester Museum of Arts and Sciences; founding role in the Society of American Indians; first president of the Society for American Archaeology
- Awards: Cornplanter Medal (1916)
- Scientific career
- Fields: Archaeology, ethnology, history, folkloristics, museology
- Workplaces: American Museum of Natural History; New York State Library; New York State Museum; Rochester Museum of Arts and Sciences

Arthur Caswell Parker (Seneca: Ga:wasowa:nëh, April 5, 1881 – January 1, 1955) was a Native American archaeologist, historian, folklorist, museologist and noted authority on Native American culture. Of Seneca, Scottish, and English ancestry, he was director of the Rochester Museum of Arts and Sciences from 1924 to 1945, when he developed its holdings and research into numerous disciplines for the Genesee Region. He was an honorary trustee of the New York State Historical Association. In 1935, he was elected the first president of the Society for American Archaeology.

== Background ==
Arthur C. Parker was born in 1881 on the Cattaraugus Reservation of the Seneca Nation of New York in Western New York. He was the son of Frederick Ely Parker, who was one-half Seneca, and his wife Geneva Hortenese Griswold, of Scots-English-American descent, who taught school on the reservation. As the Seneca are a matrilineal nation, the young Parker did not have membership status at birth, as his mother was not part of the tribe, but he was descended from prominent Seneca, including the prophet Handsome Lake, through his father.

In 1903, Parker was adopted into the tribe as an honorary member, when he was given the Seneca name Ga:wasowa:nëh ('Great Snowsnake'). His grandfather Nicholson Henry Parker was an influential Seneca leader. As a youth, Arthur lived with Nicholson on his farm and was strongly influenced by him.

Parker's grandfather's younger brother (Arthur's grand-uncle), Ely S. Parker, was a Seneca life chief and he had collaborated as a young man with Lewis Henry Morgan on his study of the Iroquois. He served as a brigadier general and secretary to General Ulysses S. Grant during the American Civil War. After the war, Ely Parker was appointed the first Indian Commissioner of Indian Affairs.

Parker was influenced by both the Seneca culture and the Christian missionary culture of his mother's family, and his social status of bridging peoples. He explored his Seneca lineage as a way of connecting himself to a powerful, symbolic past and integrating into twentieth-century American life. Although his own family was Christian, he also witnessed followers of the Seneca prophet Handsome Lake, who had tried to resurrect Indigenous Seneca religion.

Parker's daughter, Bertha Parker, was also an archaeologist and an ethnologist. Although she lacked a formal education in these subjects, she trained under her uncle, M. R. Harrington, whom Arthur Parker had apprenticed under, and she excavated with Harrington at Mesa House in the late 1920s and early 1930s. She worked as an Archaeological Assistant at the Southwest Museum from 1931 to 1941 and published a series of articles on Yurok Tribe of California.

== Education ==
Parker started his formal education on the reservation, but in 1892 his family moved to White Plains, New York. He entered public school at around age 11 and graduated from high school in 1897. Before going on to college, he spent considerable time at the American Museum of Natural History in New York City, where he was special assistant archaeologist 1901–1902. He was befriended by Frederic W. Putnam, its temporary curator of anthropology and a professor of anthropology at Harvard. Putnam encouraged the young Parker to study anthropology.

However, Parker followed the wishes of his grandfather and attended Dickinson Seminary in Williamsport, Pennsylvania, from 1900 to 1903 to study for the ministry. He left before graduating and became a reporter for the New York Sun for a few months.

Parker worked as an apprentice to archaeologist M.R. Harrington, who was his brother-in-law, digging at sites in New York State and learning techniques. He volunteered at the Museum of Natural History in New York in his spare time.

== Career ==
Parker was field archaeologist at the Peabody Museum in 1903. In 1904, he was given a two-year position as ethnologist at the New York State Library, part of the New York State Education Department, and collected cultural data on the New York Iroquois. Then in 1906, he took a position as the first archaeologist at the New York State Museum.

In 1911, together with the Native American physician Charles A. Eastman and others, Parker founded the Society of American Indians to help educate the public about Native Americans. During the 1911 New York State Capitol fire, Parker entered the building while it was ablaze and made his way up to the 4th floor in an effort to save priceless historical artifacts. He brought a tomahawk, which had been passed down through the generations in his family, and began smashing display cases, saving as many items as he could. Of the approximately 500 Iroquois artifacts in the museum, he was able to rescue about 50 of them before the spreading fire made any further salvage efforts impossible.

From 1915 to 1920, Parker was the editor of the society's American Indian Magazine. In 1916, he was awarded the Cornplanter Medal.

In 1925, Parker became director of the Rochester Museum of Arts and Sciences, where he developed the museum holdings and its research in the emerging fields of anthropology, natural history, geology, biology, history, and industry of the Genesee Region. During the 1930s and the Great Depression, he also directed the WPA-funded Indian Arts Project, which was sponsored by the Franklin D. Roosevelt administration. His advocacy and encouragement of native artists was a driving force behind interest in and market for Iroquois art. In a six-year period, the program was estimated to have to have produced over 5,000 different works ranging from traditional Iroquois craft to murals and illustrations.

In 1935, Parker was elected the first President of the Society for American Archaeology. In 1944, Parker helped found the National Congress of American Indians.

== Legacy and honors ==
- Honorary trustee of the New York Historical Association
- 1914–1915, President of the Society of American Indians
- 1935, first president of the Society of American Archeology
- 1940, Union College awarded him an honorary doctorate.
- Since 1998, the Society for American Archaeology has annually awarded the Arthur C. Parker Scholarship, which provides funds to Native Americans for training in archaeological methods.

== Retirement ==
After retiring from directing the Rochester museum in 1946, Parker became very active in Indian affairs. He moved to Nunda-wah-oh, near present-day Naples, New York, where he felt his ancestors had lived. There he overlooked Canandaigua Lake. He died there on New Year's Day, 1955, aged 73.

== Publications ==
- Excavations in an Erie Indian village and burial site at Ripley, Chautauqua Co., NY, New York State Museum Bulletin 117:459–554. 1907
- Secret Medicine Societies of the Seneca, American Anthropologist, n.s., 11:161–185. April–June, 1909
- Iroquois Uses of Maize and Other Food Plants, New York State Museum Bulletin 144:5–119. 1910
- Additional Notes on Iroquois Silversmithing, American Anthropologist, n.s., 13:283–293. April–June, 1911
- The Code of Handsome Lake, the Seneca Prophet, New York State Museum Bulletin 163: 5–148. November, 1912
- The Constitution of the Five Nations, New York State Museum Bulletin 184:7-188. April 1, 1916
- The Socials Elements of the Indian Problem, The American Journal of Sociology, 22:252–267. September, 1916
- The Origin of the Iroquois as Suggested by Their Archeology , American Anthropologist, n.s., 18:479–507. October–December, 1916
- Life of General Ely S. Parker: Last Grand Sachem of the Iroquois and General Grant's Military Secretary, Buffalo Historical Society, (Buffalo, New York), Publications, 23:14-346. 1919
- The Mound Builder Culture in New York, New York State Museum Bulletin 219/220:283-292, March–April, 1919. Fifteenth report of the director.
- American Indian Freemasonry, 1919
- The New York Indian Complex and How to Solve It, N.Y. State Archaeological Assoc. Lewis H. Morgan Chapter. Researches and Transactions, Vol. 2, No. 1. 1920. 20p.
- The Archaeological History of New York, Albany [The University of the State of New York] 1922. 2 vol. Originally published in New York State Bulletins 235,236, 237, 238. July–October, 1920.
- Seneca Myths and Folk Tales, Buffalo Historical Society Publications, 27, 1923. 465p.
- The Great Algonkin Flint Mines at Coxsackie, N. Y. State Archeological Assoc. Lewis H. Morgan Chapter. Researches and Transactions, 4:105–125. 1925
- An Analytical History of the Seneca Indians, N. Y. State Archeological Assoc. Lewis H. Morgan Chapter. Researches and Transactions, 6:162p. 1926
- The Indian How Book, New York, George H. Doran Company, 1931
- Skunny Wundy and Other Indian Tales, New York, George H. Doran Company, 1926
- Sources and Range of Cooper's Indian Lore, New York History, 35:445–456. 1954
- The History of the Seneca Indians, Port Washington, NY: I. J. Friedman, 1967
- Parker on the Iroquois, Edited by William N. Fenton, Syracuse University Press, 1986

== See also ==
- John Napoleon Brinton Hewitt
- Max Weber
- Orenda
