= Atahensic =

Iroquoian sky goddess

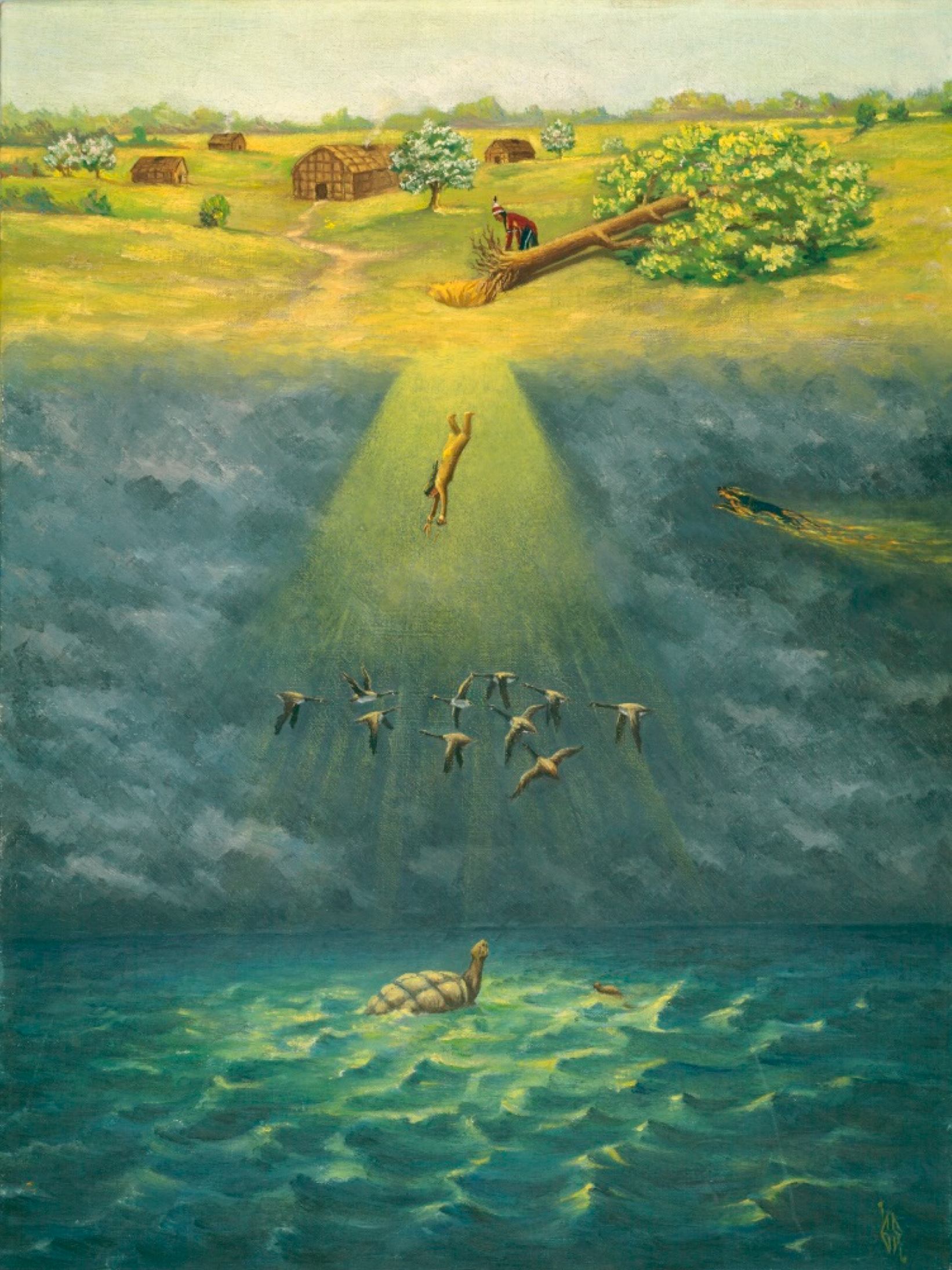
Sky Woman (1936), by Seneca artist Ernest Smith, depicts the story of Turtle Island.

Atahensic (Note: Mohawk: Atsi’tsaká:ion transl. Mature Flower, also Awenhnhá:i and Teiawenháien; Seneca: Awëöha’i’ transl. Mature Flower), also known as Sky Woman, is an Iroquoian sky goddess worshipped by the Wendat and Haudenosaunee. Atahensic is associated with marriage, childbirth, and feminine affairs in general.

According to tradition, at the time of creation, Atahensic lived in the Upper World, but when digging up a tree, it left a hole in the ground that led to a great sky, under which was water. Atahensic fell through this hole. After her fall, birds or the Fire Dragon carried her down the hole onto the water. A giant turtle then emerged from the underground waters for her to rest on. In some versions, she then gave birth to twin sons: Hahgwehdiyu (Skyholder or Sapling) and Hahgwehdaetgah (Flint). Hahgwehdiyu was born normally; Hahgwehdaetgah, the evil twin, killed Atahensic by bursting out of her side during birth. When Atahensic died, Hahgwehdiyu created the sky and, with her head, the Sun. Hahgwehdaetgah, however, created darkness to drive down the sun. Hahgwehdiyu then created the Moon and Stars from his mother's breasts, and tasked them, his sisters, to guard the night sky. He gave the rest of his mother's body to the earth, the Great Mother from whom all life came. Hahgwehdiyu then planted a seed into his mother's corpse. From this seed grew corn, as a gift to mankind.

This Atahensic is the Wendat name for the first mother, and not that of the (confederated) Haudenosaunee. The Seneca generally give this character no name other than Eagentci, literally old woman or ancient bodied.

There is another version of the myth of Atahensic in which she is Hahgwehdiyu and Hahgwehdaetgah's maternal grandmother instead. According to this variant, Atahensic had a daughter named Tekawerahkwa (transl. Earth Woman), whom the west wind impregnated with Hahgwehdiyu and Hahgwehdaetgah. As Tekawerahkwa died by childbirth, either she wished for her body to sustain the people or Atahensic sowed on her grave the seeds she had brought when she fell to Earth, but never planted before. Out of Tekawerahkwa's remains grew various plants: the sister spirits of the corn, beans, and squash came from her breasts, hands, and navel respectively; sunflowers from her legs; strawberries from her heart; tobacco from her head; and purple potatoes or sunchokes from her feet.
