= Hero Twins in Native American culture =

Mythology in indigenous culture

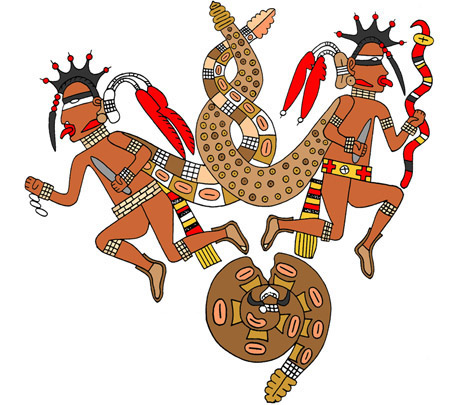
Mississippian Hero Twins emerging from a crack in the back of a raccoon-faced Horned Serpent. Redrawn from an engraved whelk shell by artist Herb Roe.

The Hero Twins (or God Boys) are recurring characters from the mythologies of the indigenous peoples of the Americas. The specifics of each myth vary from tribe to tribe, but each story has a pair of twins (usually with magical powers) who were born when their pregnant mother was killed by the tale's antagonist. Twins were considered unnatural in many cultures of this region, with beliefs about them having supernatural abilities.

Sometimes, the twins are separated at birth. Various versions have their mother's killer leaving one where he could be easily be found by his family and the other deep in the wilderness so that one boy grew up civilized and the other wild. Eventually they become reunited and avenge the death of their mother.

The Twin Heroes share many similarities in the mythology of different tribes, but are different in their relationships with other mythological figures, their associations with stars or animal spirits, and the nature of the particular adventures they go on.

In some traditions, the twins personified good and evil: one twin is good while the other is evil, but in others both are benevolent heroes. In some versions of this myth, the evil twin manipulates others into blaming his good brother for his misdeeds. The two brothers coexisted for a while, each making their own changes to the world. In the end, though, the Twin Gods fight each other, and the good brother prevails. In other traditions, the Twin Gods are not considered good or evil but instead represent day and night, summer and winter, and life and death. In some versions of that tradition, one is a trickster rather than a villain, and the brothers' relationship is one of rivalry rather than enmity.

== Arikara ==
Drinks Brains is an Arikara hero, one of a pair of magical twins. His twin brother Long Teeth was magically generated from the afterbirth and grew up in the wilderness. When their mother is killed, his father took drinks Brains from her womb and sustained him on a broth made from deer brains in place of mother's milk.

== Aztec ==
Quetzalcoatl and Tezcatlipoca are culture heroes and creator deities of the Aztecs and are said to be brothers. They are often seen in competition with each other, like when the two fought over who would become the sun. They are also seen as allies however, as both are considered protectors of Earth. They are also depicted as having another brother, Xolotl. He is even shown as helping Quetzalcoatl returning the bones of the humans to the land of the living to bring them back to life.

== Bakairi ==
Keri and Kame are the creator gods in Bakairi legend, adapting the world for humans to live on as well as teaching them to use fire and how to hunt.

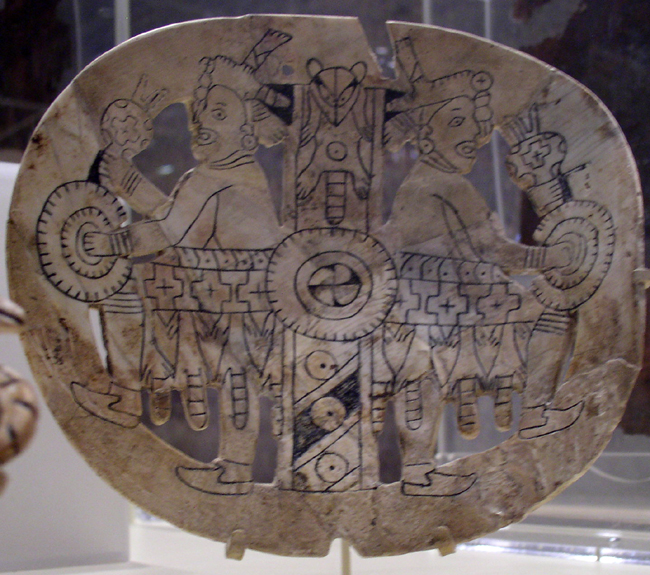
Possible representation of Hero Twins on an engraved shell gorget from Spiro Mounds, Oklahoma

== Caddo ==
Village Boy and Wild Boy are young heroes from the Caddo Nation. In most versions, the monster Caddaja kills a pregnant woman while her husband is hunting. Both of the children survive, but Village Boy is found by his father and raised in civilization while Wild Boy is lost in the woods. Eventually the two brothers are reunited and avenge their mother's murder. The twins are associated with thunder and lightning.

== Carib ==
Makunaima ("He Works By Night") and Piai ("Medicine Man") are the Creator gods of the Akawaio and neighboring Cariban tribes, said to never have been seen by mortals. Though older myths feature Makunaima as a legendary culture hero who slays monsters, in more recent texts those exploits are ascribed to Sigu instead while Makunaima becomes the Great Spirit, though Cariban cosmology became muddled since the arrival of Christian missionaries.

== Cariban ==
Amalivaca, and his twin brother Vochi, are benevolent demigods from the Tamanac and other Cariban tribal legends. Amalivaca transforms the world for the humans and shows them how to survive. In some Carib traditions, they are combined with Sigu and considered to be the son of the high god Tamosi.

== Crow ==
Curtain Boy and Spring Boy are a pair of mythological twin heroes from Crow folklore known as the Sacred Twins. Curtain-Boy was raised by his father while Spring-Boy grew up in the wilderness.

== Haudenosaunee ==
Sapling or Skyholder and his brother Flint are the grandsons of the sky goddess Atahensic. In Iroquoian and Algonquian mythology, the culture hero has a brother named Flint who is often malevolent (associated with winter, night, and death) going on to create hardships for humans and fighting with his brother.

In Haudenosaunee legends, Flint's brother is the creator god Sky Holder. According to some versions the twins created humankind together, explaining why people can be both good and evil or creative and destructive. In other versions his brother alone was the creator of humans while Flint was the god of death. In some myths, Flint deceives his grandmother into believing his brother was the killer, but his brother defeats and imprisons him. Flint and Sky Holder are said to exist in cosmic balance, with both light and darkness being necessary for life.

Flint is less prominent in Algonquian mythology, but is sometimes described as the brother of the Anishinabe hero Nanabozho or the Wabanaki hero Glooscap. In Algonquian legends, Flint does not generally commit any further crimes or problems other than the death of his mother whom he killed in childbirth by intentionally cutting his way out rather than waiting to be born. In some stories the culture hero kills him to avenge their mother's death in childbirth, but in other stories Flint remains as one of the seasonal or directional demigods.

== Hidatsa ==
Lodge Boy and Thrown Away are young heroes from the legends of the Midwestern and Plains people. In most versions of the story, the monster Two-Face cuts a pregnant mother open and throws one of her unborn children out the door into the yard, forgetting the other in the lodge. Because of their magic both children survive, but Lodge Boy is found by his father while Thrown Away is not found. In some versions, Lodge Boy is moral while Thrown Away is wicked.

== Ho-Chunk ==
Ho-Chunk and other tribes have a tradition of Red Horn and his sons.

== Ioway ==
Dore and Wahredwa are a pair of monster hunters, one being uncontrollable and chaotic.

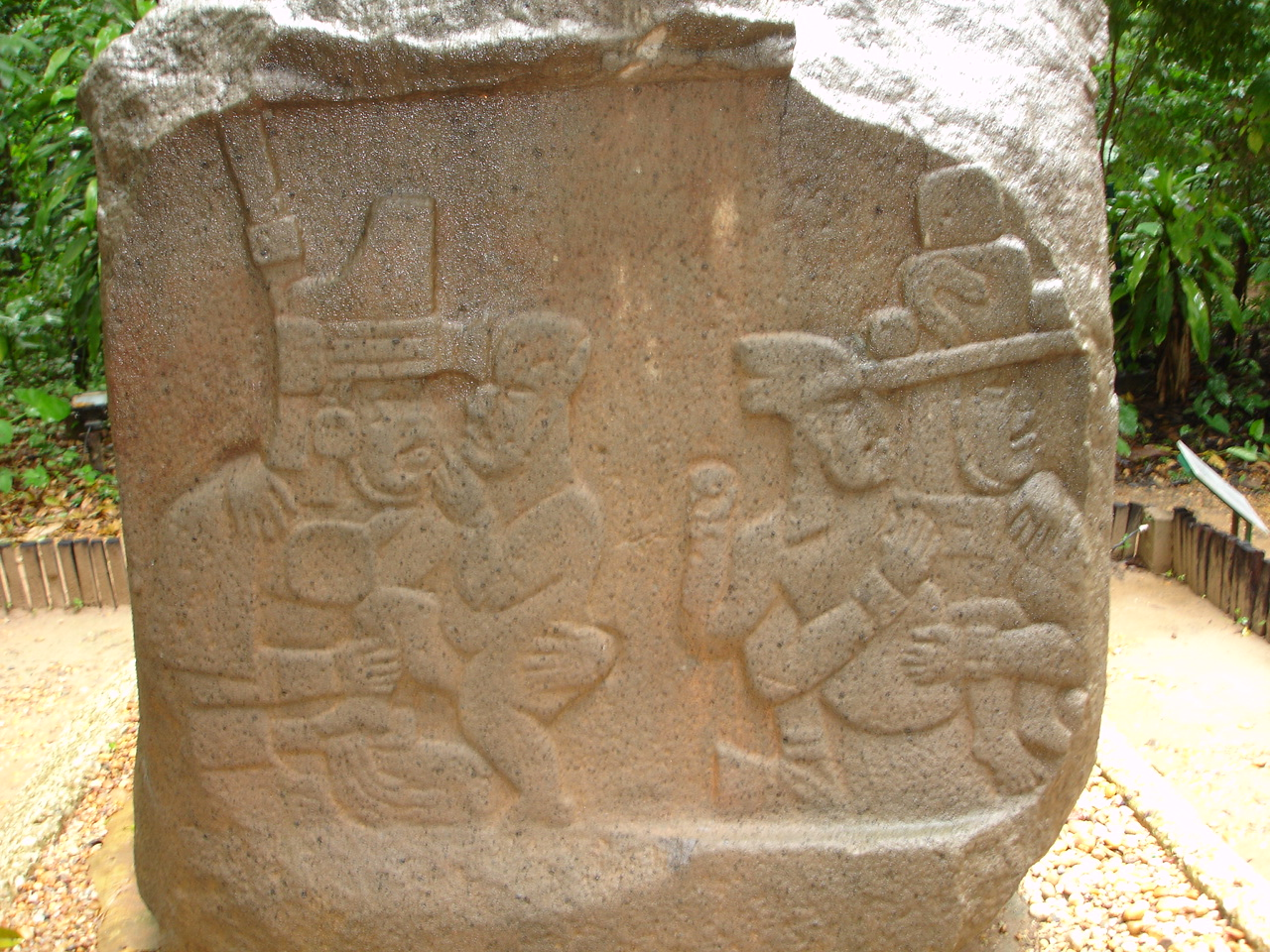
Two lively were-jaguar babies on the left side of La Venta Altar 5. The two were-jaguars depicted on Altar 5 at La Venta as being carried out from a niche or cave, places often associated with the emergence of human beings, may be mythic hero twins essential to Olmec mythology and perhaps forerunners of the Maya Hero Twins.

== Maya ==
Hunahpu and Xbalanque, the Maya Hero Twins, were conceived when the severed head of Hun Hunahpu spat in the hand of their mother, Xquic. Huracan first met the twins when he needed their assistance with killing Seven Macaw. After the boys got their ball back from their grandmother by outsmarting her, the lords of Xibalba invited them to play a game. They gave them seven deadly tasks to complete, but they were only able to complete the last one which resulted in Camazotz cutting off Hunahpu's head. He survived and, with his brother, brought about the end of Xibalba. Their tale ends with them becoming the sun and moon.

== Navajo ==
Yolkai Estsan and Asdzą́ą́ Nádleehé are Navajo goddesses, the latter of which gave birth to the Hero Twins Monster Slayer and Born-for-Water. In the creation myth of the Navajo the hero twins Monster Slayer and Born for Water acquire lightning bolt arrows from their father, the Sun, in order to rid the world of monsters that prey upon the people.

== Seminole ==
The Little Thunders were a pair of spirit twins from Miccosukee legend, who were the dual chiefs of the water spirits. One brother was the sound of thunder while the other was the flash of lightning.

== Taíno ==
Jukihú and Juracán are the twin sons of Atabex (Mother Nature), the personifications of Order and Chaos, respectively; from the Arawak nation which once stretched from South America through the Caribbean and up to Florida in the US.

== Wabanaki ==
Gluskap is a cultural hero who sometimes has a twin brother in Wabanaki folklore. Malsumis is the most common brother used by folklorists but sometimes his brother is Mikumwesu, Mateguas, or Marten.

In Mi'kmaq legends, Marten (or Apistanewj) is Gluskab's adopted brother and can shift back and forth between his human form and the form of a type of weasel which was considered sacred by some Mi'kmaq bands.

In some Wolastoqey and Passamaquoddy legends, Gluskab's brother is Mikumwesu, the progenitor of the race of dwarves known as Mikumwesuck. Unlike the others, Mikumwesu is heroic, good-natured, and loyal. He uses a bow and arrow and has magical powers similar to his brother.

Mateguas (or Rabbit) is a light-hearted trickster in other Wabanaki tribes, but a serious character in Abenaki legend. After his death, Mateguas became ruler of the underworld, communicating with Gluskab from beyond the grave to give him secrets and advice. Mateguas shares many similarities with death deities of the Great Lakes Algonquian tribes such as the Potawatomi and Ojibwe rather than the more typical figures of Wabanaki mythology.

Malsumis (or Malsum) means "wolf" in southern Wabanaki languages and is said to be the name of an evil spirit who is the twin brother of Glooscap, however some Wabanaki elders have been stated that this is not a real Wabanaki myth. Wolves are not evil figures to the Wabanaki and the wolf is even Gluskab's loyal companion in Wolastoqey legends. Malsumis also does not appear in older texts of the story. Folklorists might have confused Gluskab with the Anishinabe culture hero who often has a wolf brother (Moqwaio) or the Iroquois culture hero, whose evil twin is Flint. It's also possible that some Malsum stories were originally told about Lox, a malevolent Wabanaki trickster figure. The first recorded version of the Malsum story that we're aware of is in "The Algonquin Legends of New England" by Charles Leland, where he attributes his information to a Micmac despite Malsum not being a Micmac name. It is also noted that the prefix "mal-" is of Latin origin.

== Yuma ==
In the Yuma creation myth, Kokomaht and Bahotahl were the representations of nature. Bahotahl created the animals, but created them imperfectly since he was blind. Kokomaht attempts to correct his mistake, but only makes it worse due to his ineptitude.
