= False Faces =

False Faces or False Face may refer to:

- False Face Society, a medicinal society among the Haudenosaunee
- False Faces (1932 film), an American drama film
- False Faces (1943 film), an American mystery film
- The False Faces, a 1919 American silent drama film
- Let 'Em Have It, a 1935 American gangster film, also known as False Faces
- False Face (film), a 1977 horror film also known as Scalpel
- False-Face, a DC Comics supervillain
- False Face Society (DC Comics), a villainous group in the DC Comics universe
