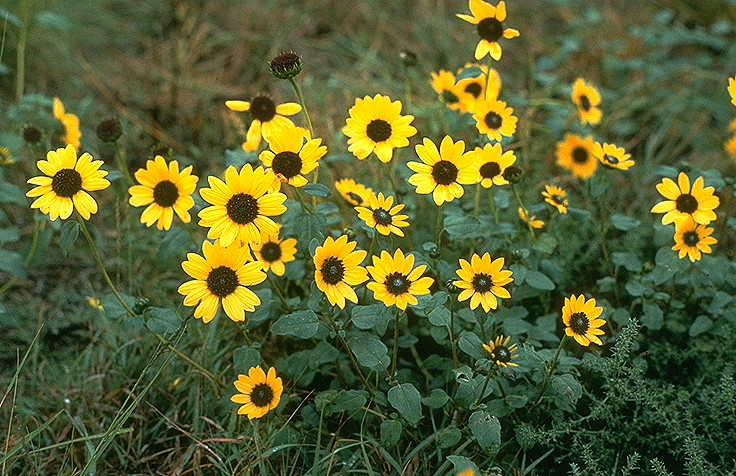
- Prairie sunflower

Conservation status
- Least Concern (IUCN 3.1)

- Secure (NatureServe)

Scientific classification
- Kingdom: Plantae
- Clade: Tracheophytes
- Clade: Angiosperms
- Clade: Eudicots
- Clade: Asterids
- Order: Asterales
- Family: Asteraceae
- Tribe: Heliantheae
- Genus: Helianthus
- Species: H. petiolaris

Binomial name
- Helianthus petiolaris Nutt.

Synonyms
- Helianthus couplandii B.Boivin; Helianthus integrifolius Nutt.; Helianthus patens Lehm.; Helianthus canescens (A.Gray) S.Watson, syn of var. canescens; Helianthus canus (Britton) Wooton & Standl., syn of var. canescens

= Helianthus petiolaris =

Species of sunflower

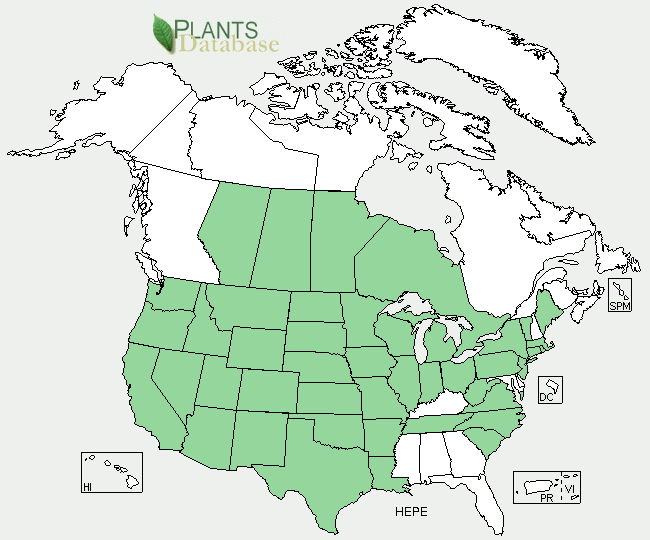
Range in the United States and Canada

Helianthus petiolaris is a North American plant species in the family Asteraceae, commonly known as the prairie sunflower or lesser sunflower. Naturalist and botanist Thomas Nuttall was the first to describe the prairie sunflower in 1821. The word petiolaris in Latin means “having a petiole”. The species originated in Western United States, but has since expanded east. The prairie sunflower is sometimes considered a weed.

== Distribution ==
Helianthus petiolaris originated in the dry prairies of Minnesota, Oregon, Texas, the Dakotas, California, and other states in Western and Central United States. It has since expanded its distribution to throughout the Eastern United States and into central and western Canada. It is now the most widely distributed species of sunflower besides H. annuus.

== Habitat and ecology ==
Prairie sunflowers are commonly found growing in sandy areas. They can also be found in heavy clay soil and in dry prairies. They are unable to grow in shady areas; they need to be in direct sunlight. Prairie sunflowers require dry to moist soil. This species of sunflower is an annual flower, blooming between June and September.

== Morphology ==
Prairie sunflower is a taprooted annual. It grows up to 4 ft (120 cm) tall. The leaves appear alternate and the flowers have a close resemblance to the traditional sunflower. The flowers are hermaphrodites, which means the flowers contain both male and female parts. The stem of the flower is erect and hairy. The leaves are alternate, have a lanceolate shape, are rough in texture, are bluish-green in color, and have a length between 2 and 5 in.

== Flowers ==
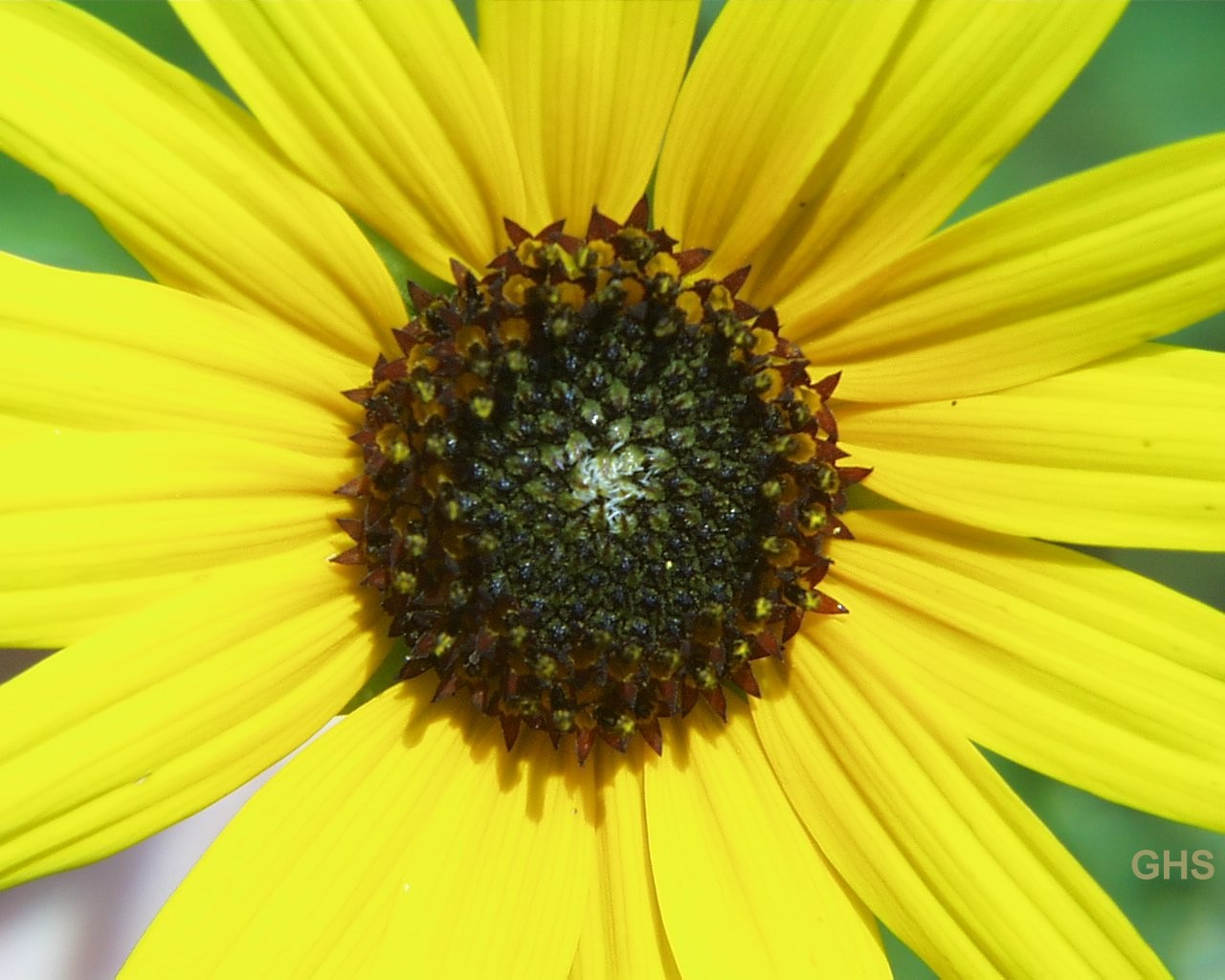
Prairie Sunflower

Helianthus petiolaris has flower heads reminiscent of those of a common sunflower, H. annuus. The fruits of the flowers are known as achenes. The flower head contains 10-30 yellow ray florets, surrounding 50-100 dark red-brown disc florets, and green, lanceolate phyllaries (bracts). The center of the flower has hints of white due to the presence of white hairs on the chaff. The flowers attract butterflies and bees for pollination.

=== Food ===
The seeds in the plant are edible and can be ground up into an oily meal or into a butter.

=== Medicinal ===
Powdered leaves of the prairie sunflower are said to work well with the healing of sores and swellings.

Varieties

- Helianthus petiolaris var. canescens A.Gray - Arizona, California, Nevada, New Mexico, Texas, Chihuahua
- Helianthus petiolaris var. var. fallax (Heiser) B.L.Turner - Arizona, Colorado, Nevada, Utah
- Helianthus petiolaris var. var. petiolaris - most of species range
