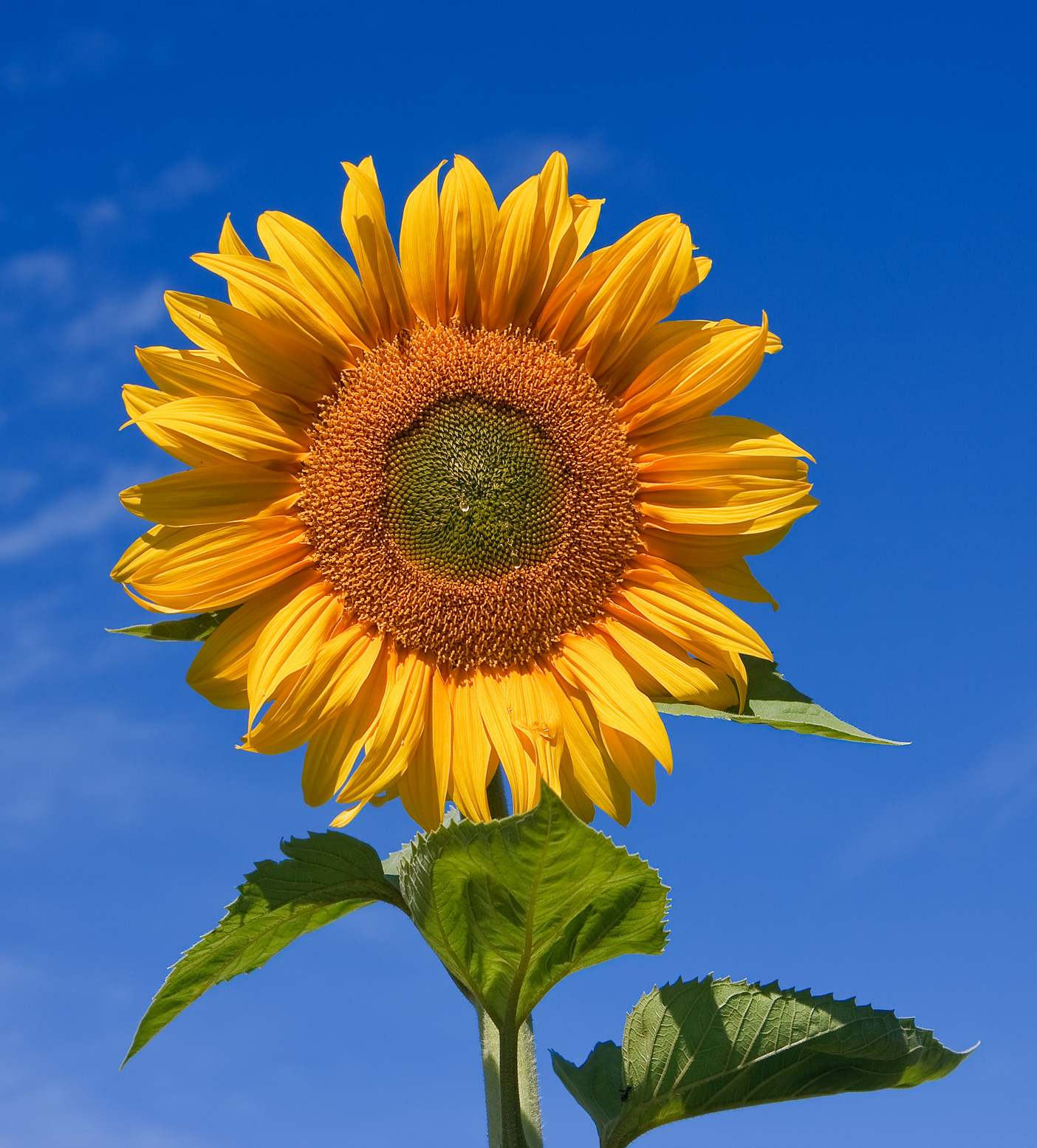
- Helianthus annuus cv. Sunfola

Conservation status
- Least Concern (IUCN 3.1)

- Secure (NatureServe)

Scientific classification
- Kingdom: Plantae
- Clade: Tracheophytes
- Clade: Angiosperms
- Clade: Eudicots
- Clade: Asterids
- Order: Asterales
- Family: Asteraceae
- Tribe: Heliantheae
- Genus: Helianthus
- Species: H. annuus

Binomial name
- Helianthus annuus L.

Synonyms
- Synonymy: Helianthus aridus Rydb.; Helianthus erythrocarpus Bartl.; Helianthus indicus L.; Helianthus jaegeri Heiser; Helianthus lenticularis Douglas; Helianthus macrocarpus DC. & A.DC.; Helianthus multiflorus Hook.; Helianthus ovatus Lehm.; Helianthus platycephalus Cass.; Helianthus tubaeformis Nutt.

= Common sunflower =

Species of flowering plant

The common sunflower (Helianthus annuus) is a large annual forb in the daisy family Asteraceae. The most common varieties have large yellow orange flowers heads, that are a tall stem. The flowers produce seeds in a floret, that follows the fibonacci sequence. The domesticated form of common sunflower is harvested for its edible seeds, which come in two types: oil and confectionery seeds.

Oilseed sunflowers are widely grown globally and represent the fourth most used vegetable oil in the world. They also are used widely as bird food or as food for livestock. In contrast, confectionery sunflower seeds are often eaten as a snack food or in baking. Though first domesticate in the Americas, production of sunflowers commercially is concentrated in Russia, Ukraine, and the European Union.

There also are horticultural sunflower varieties that are used as plantings in domestic gardens for aesthetics. In some cultivation practices sunflowers are used for phytoremediation, removing chemicals from the soil, and as cover crop because root exudates help with suppression of certain kinds of weeds. Wild plants are known for their multiple flower heads, whereas the domestic sunflower often possesses a single large flower head atop an unbranched stem.

== Description ==
The plant has an erect rough-hairy stem, reaching typical heights of 3 metres (10 feet). The tallest sunflower on record achieved 10.9 m (35 ft 9 in). Sunflower leaves are broad, coarsely toothed, rough and mostly alternate; those near the bottom are largest and commonly heart-shaped.

=== Flower ===
The plant flowers in summer. What is often called the "flower" of the sunflower is actually a "flower head" (pseudanthium), 7.5–12.5 centimetres (3–5 in) wide, of numerous small individual five-petaled flowers ("florets"). The outer flowers, which resemble petals, are called ray flowers. Each "petal" consists of a ligule composed of fused petals of an asymmetrical ray flower. They are sexually sterile and may be yellow, red, orange, or other colors. The spirally arranged flowers in the center of the head are called disk flowers. These mature into fruit (sunflower "seeds").

The prairie sunflower (H. petiolaris) is similar in appearance to the wild common sunflower; the scales in its central disk are tipped by white hairs.

==== Heliotropism ====
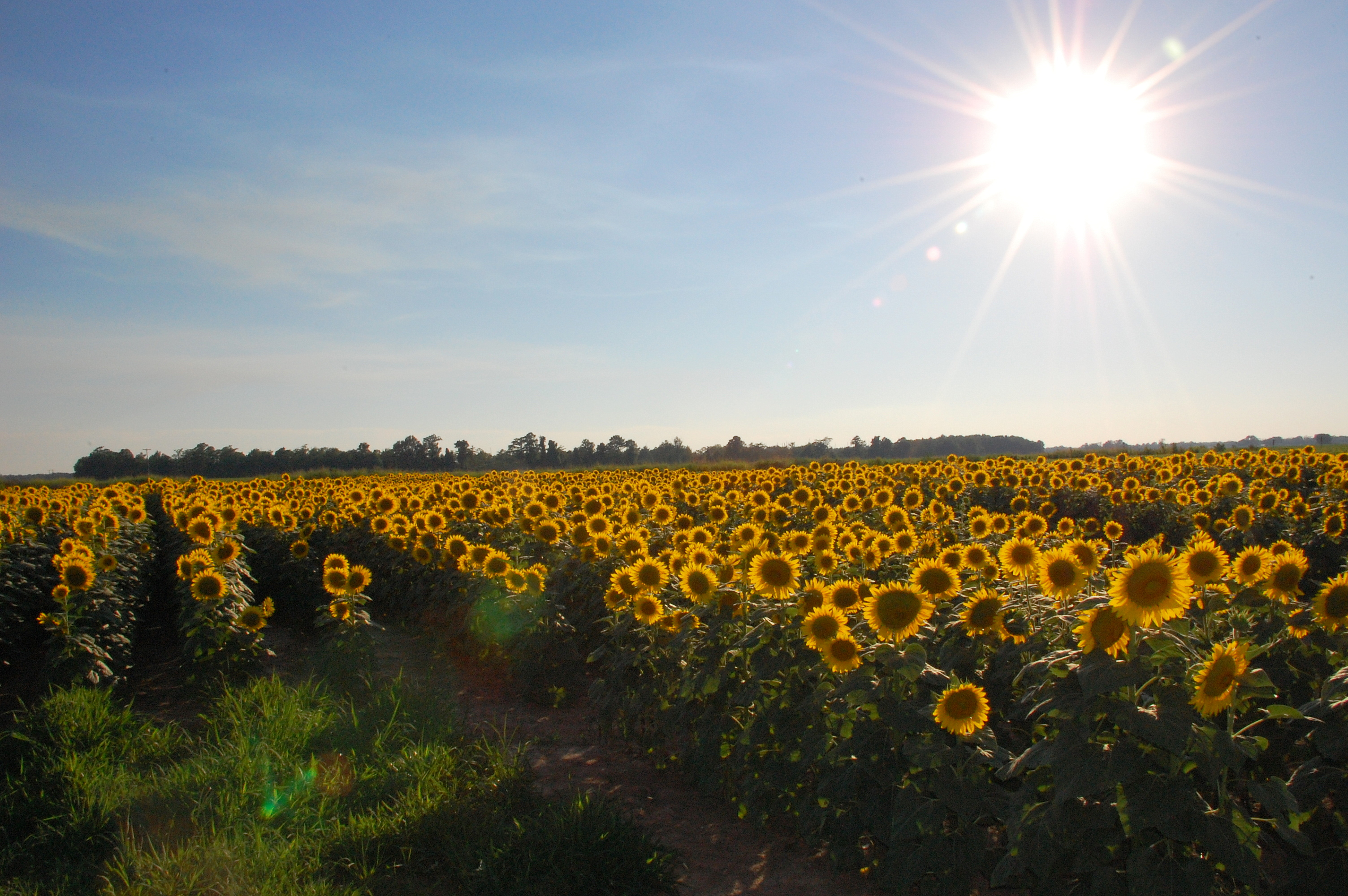
Flower heads facing east, away from the late afternoon sun

A common misconception is that flowering sunflower heads track the Sun across the sky. Although immature flower buds exhibit this behaviour, the mature flowering heads point in a fixed (and typically easterly) direction throughout the day. This old misconception was disputed in 1597 by the English botanist John Gerard, who grew sunflowers in his famous herbal garden: "[some] have reported it to turn with the Sun, the which I could never observe, although I have endeavored to find out the truth of it." The uniform alignment of sunflower heads in a field might give some people the false impression that the flowers are tracking the Sun.

This alignment results from heliotropism in an earlier development stage, the young flower stage, before full maturity of flower heads (anthesis). Young sunflowers orient themselves in the direction of the sun. At dawn, the head of the flower faces east and moves west throughout the day. When sunflowers reach full maturity, they no longer follow the sun and continuously face east. Young flowers reorient overnight to face east in anticipation of the morning. Their heliotropic motion is a circadian rhythm, synchronized by the sun, which continues if the sun disappears on cloudy days or if plants are moved to constant light. They are able to regulate their circadian rhythm in response to the blue-light emitted by a light source. If a sunflower plant in the bud stage is rotated 180°, the bud will be turning away from the sun for a few days, as resynchronization with the sun takes time.

When growth of the flower stalk stops and the flower is mature, the heliotropism also stops and the flower faces east from that moment onward. This eastward orientation allows rapid warming in the morning, and as a result, an increase in pollinator visits. Sunflowers do not have a pulvinus below their inflorescence. A pulvinus is a flexible segment in the leaf stalks (petiole) of some plant species and functions as a 'joint'. It effectuates leaf motion due to reversible changes in turgor pressure which occurs without growth. The closing leaves and levered petioles of the Mimosa pudica are a good example of reversible movement via pulvinuli.

Vogel's model for n=1 ... 500

==== Floret arrangement ====
Generally, each floret is oriented toward the next by approximately the golden angle, 137.5°, producing a pattern of interconnecting spirals, where the number of left spirals and the number of right spirals are successive Fibonacci numbers. Typically, there are 34 spirals in one direction and 55 in the other; however, in a very large sunflower head there could be 89 in one direction and 144 in the other. This pattern produces the most efficient packing of seeds mathematically possible within the flower head.

A model for the pattern of florets in the head of a sunflower was proposed by H. Vogel in 1979. This is expressed in polar coordinates

$$r=c \sqrt{n},$$
$$\theta=n \times 137.5^{\circ},$$

where θ is the angle, r is the radius or distance from the center, and n is the index number of the floret and c is a constant scaling factor. It is a form of Fermat's spiral. The angle 137.5° is related to the golden ratio (55/144 of a circular angle, where 55 and 144 are Fibonacci numbers) and gives a close packing of florets. This model has been used to produce computer generated representations of sunflowers.

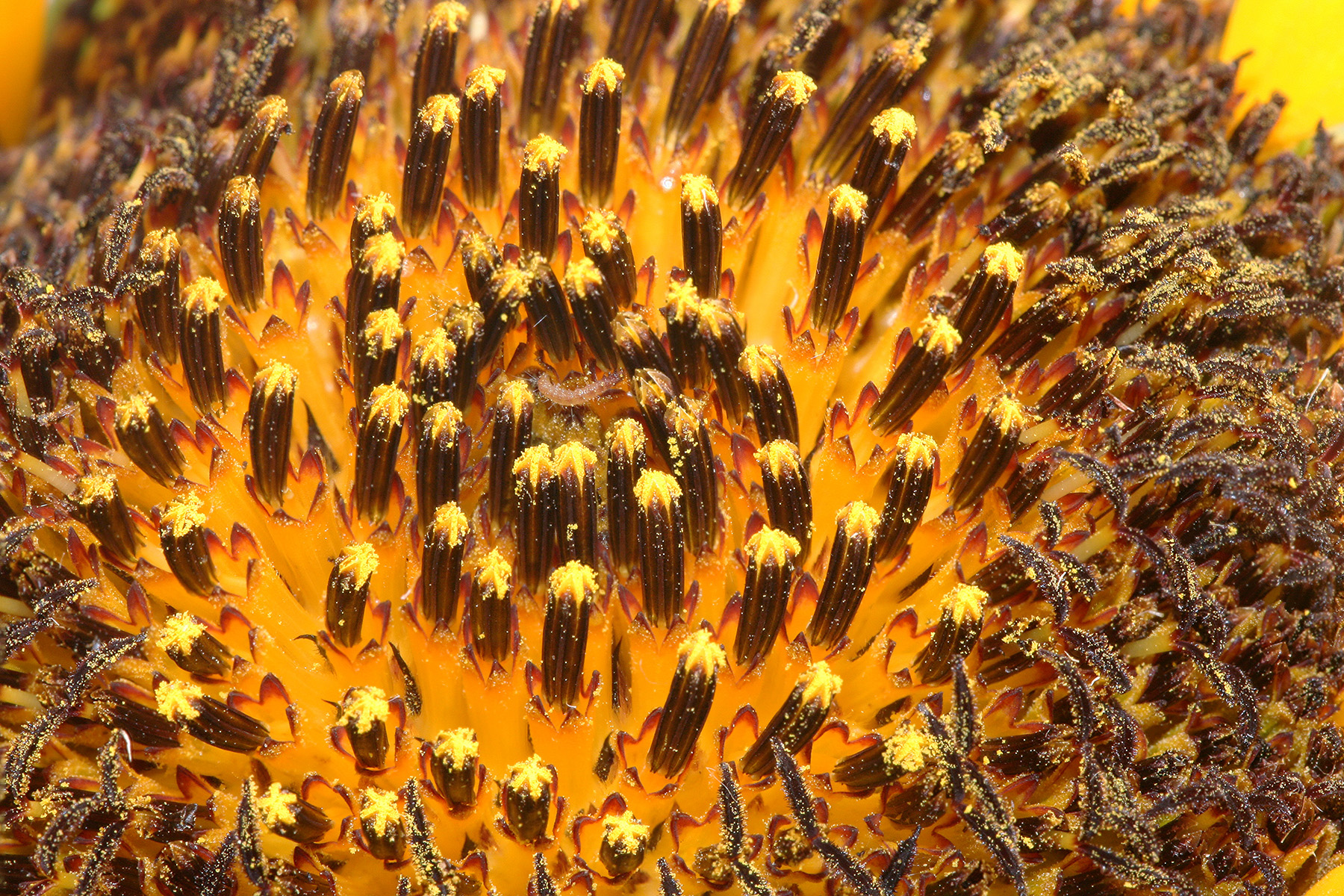
Detail of disk florets

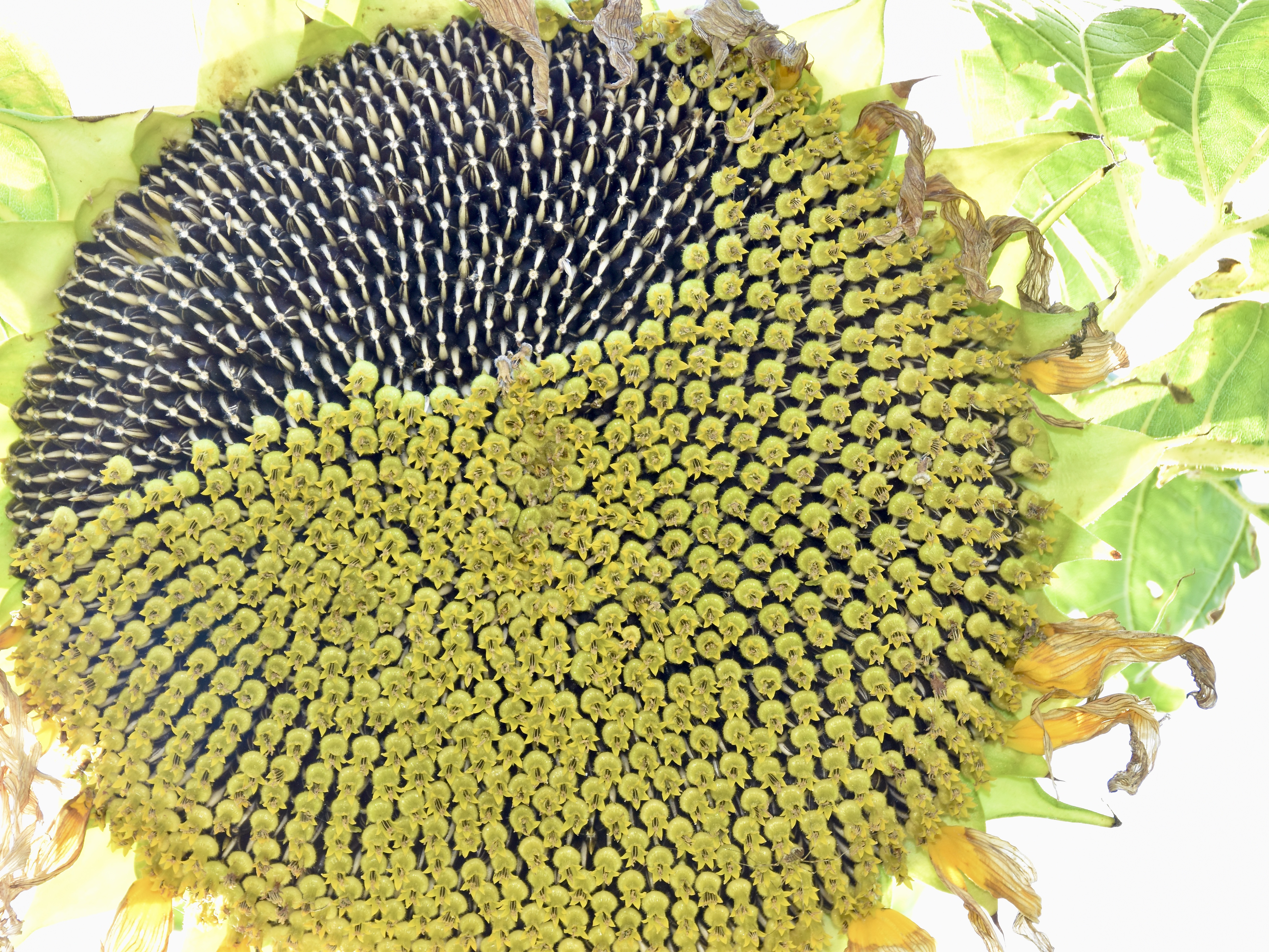
A head of a sunflower

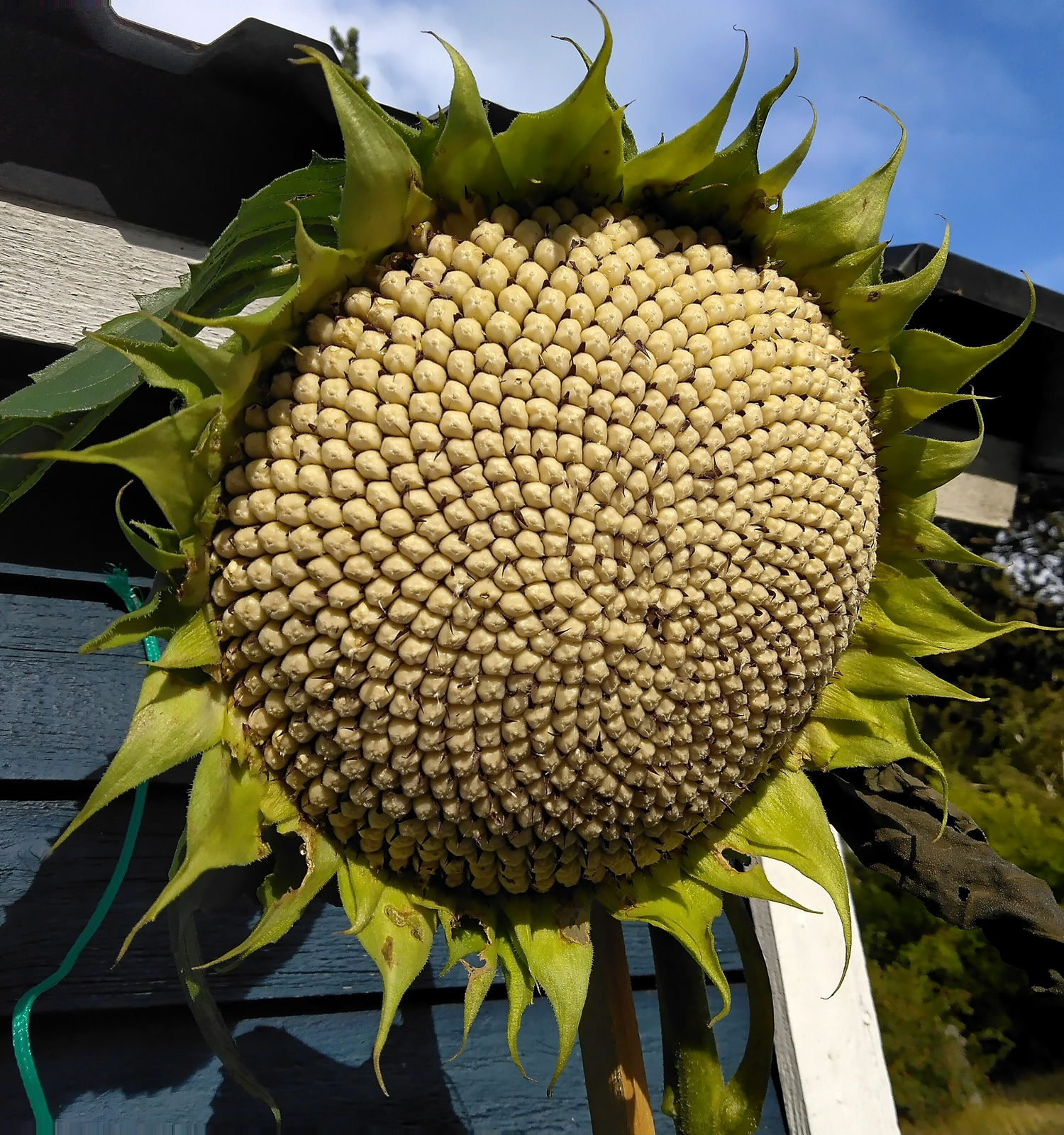
After flowering, the seeds are visible

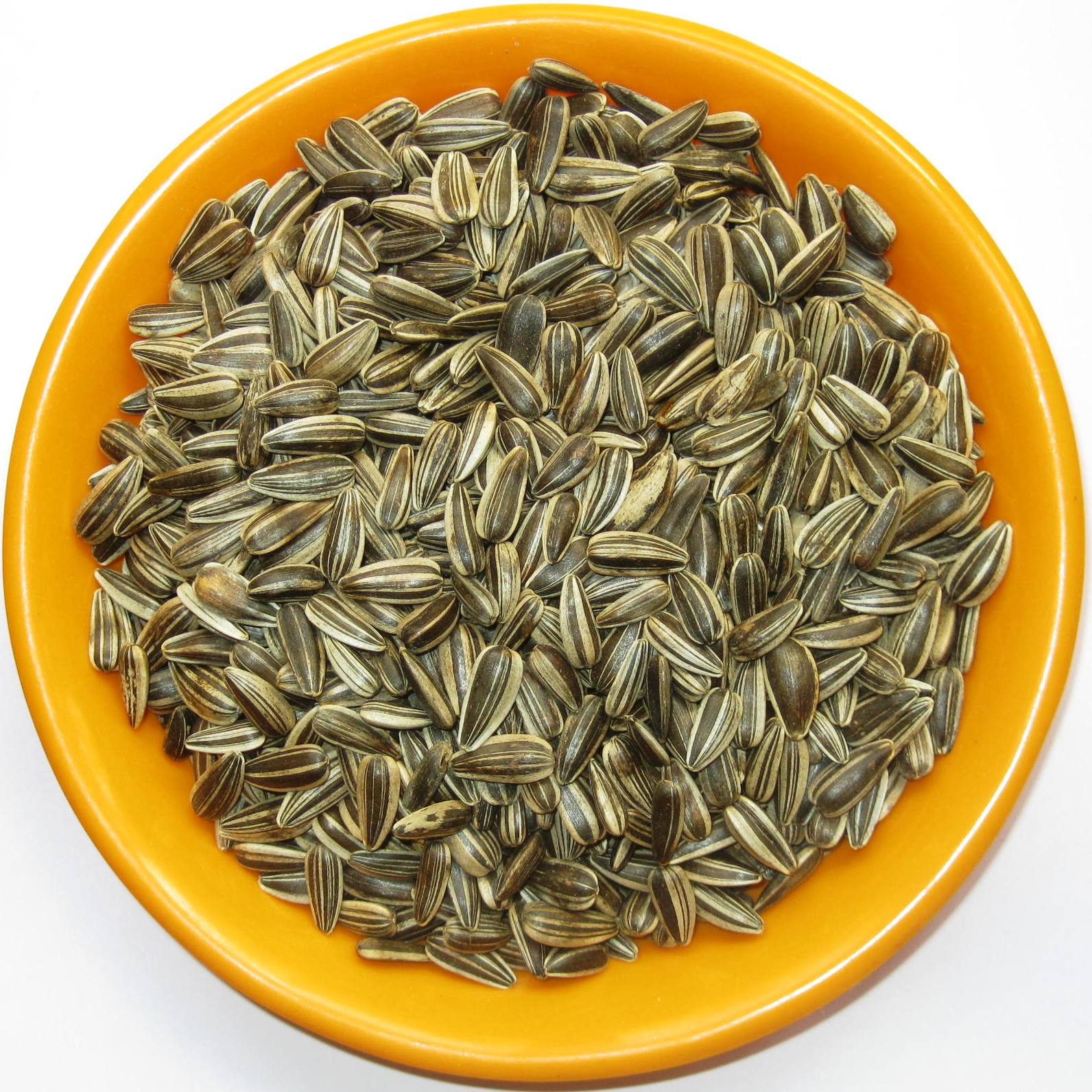
Sunflower seeds

=== Genome ===
The sunflower genome is diploid with a base chromosome number of 17 and an estimated genome size of 2,871–3,189 billion base pairs. Some sources claim its true size is around 3.5 billion base pairs (slightly larger than the human genome).

== Etymology ==
The genus name Helianthus comes from Ancient Greek ἥλιος (hḗlios), meaning "sun", and ἄνθος (ánthos), meaning "flower". The species name annuus means "yearly" in Latin.

== Distribution and habitat ==
The plant was first domesticated in the Americas. Sunflower seeds were brought to Europe from the Americas in the 16th century, where, along with sunflower oil, they became a widespread cooking ingredient. With time, the bulk of industrial-scale production has shifted to Eastern Europe, and (as of 2020) Russia and Ukraine together produce over half of worldwide seed production.

Sunflowers on a field in Croatia

Sunflowers grow best in fertile, moist, well-drained soil with heavy mulch. They often appear on dry open areas and foothills. Outside of cultivation, the common sunflower is found on clay-based soils that typically are wet in the spring, but dry out later in the summer. In contrast, the related Helianthus debilis and Helianthus petiolaris are found on drier, sandier soils.

The common sunflower is considered to be native to the central and western USA, southern Canada, and northern Mexico. Regardless of its original range, it can now be found in almost every part of the world that is not tropical, desert, or tundra.

== Ecology ==
=== Threats and diseases ===
One of the major threats that sunflowers face today is Fusarium, a filamentous fungus that is found largely in soil and plants. It is a pathogen that over the years has caused an increasing amount of damage and loss of sunflower crops, some as extensive as 80% of damaged crops.

Downy mildew is another disease to which sunflowers are susceptible. Its susceptibility to downy mildew is particularly high due to the sunflower's way of growth and development. Sunflower seeds are generally planted only an inch deep in the ground. When such shallow planting is done in moist and soaked earth or soil, it increases the chances of diseases such as downy mildew.

Another major threat to sunflower crops are broomrapes, a family of plants which parasitize the roots of various other plants, including sunflowers. Damage and loss to sunflower crops as a result of broomrape can be as high as 100%.

== Cultivation ==
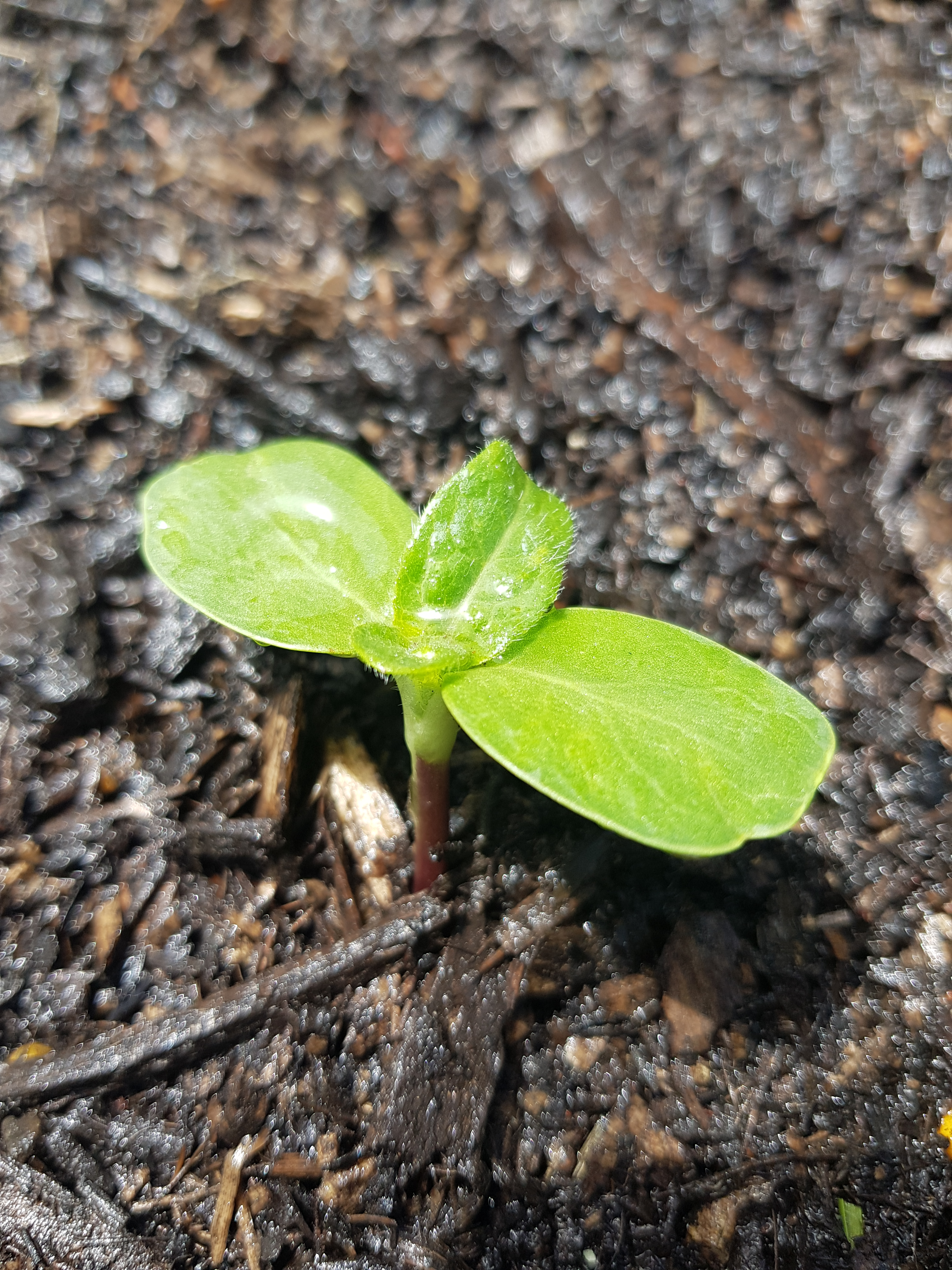
Seedling of a dwarf sunflower

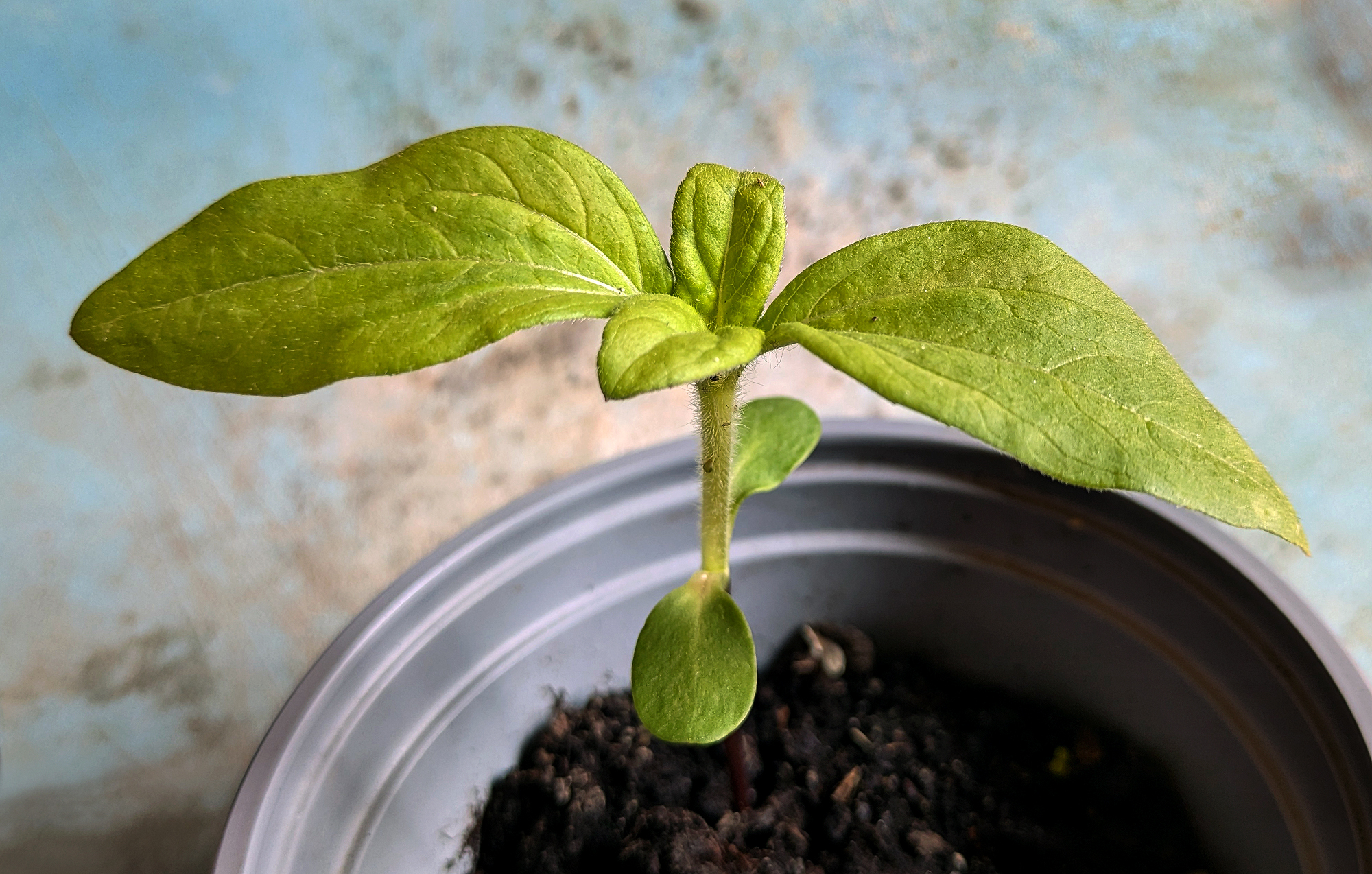
An 8 cm tall seedling of a common sunflower

In commercial planting, seeds are planted 45 cm (1 1/2 ft) apart and 2.5 cm (1 in) deep.

=== History ===
The common sunflower was one of several plants cultivated by Native Americans in prehistoric North America as part of the Eastern Agricultural Complex, which also included goosefoot, little barley, squash, and a variety of other crops, most of which were replaced by maize and beans following their introduction. Although it was commonly accepted that the sunflower was first domesticated in what is now the southeastern US, roughly 5,000 years ago, there is evidence that it was first domesticated in Mexico around 2600 BCE. These crops were found in Tabasco, Mexico, at the San Andres dig site. The earliest known examples in the US of a fully domesticated sunflower have been found in Tennessee, and date to around 2300 BCE. Other very early examples come from rockshelter sites in Eastern Kentucky. Many indigenous American peoples used the sunflower as the symbol of their solar deity, including the Aztecs and the Otomi of Mexico and the Incas in South America. In 1510, early Spanish explorers encountered the sunflower in the Americas and carried its seeds back to Europe. Of the four plants known to have been domesticated in eastern North America and to have become important agricultural commodities, the sunflower is currently the most economically important.

Research of phylogeographic relations and population demographic patterns across sunflowers has demonstrated that earlier cultivated sunflowers form a clade from wild populations from the Great Plains, which indicates that there was a single domestication event in central North America. Following the cultivated sunflower's origin, it may have gone through significant bottlenecks dating back to ~5,000 years ago.

In the 16th century the first crop breeds were brought from America to Europe by explorers. Domestic sunflower seeds have been found in Mexico, dating to 2100 BCE. Native American people grew sunflowers as a crop from Mexico to Southern Canada. They then were introduced to the Russian Empire, where oilseed cultivators were located, and the flowers were developed and grown on an industrial scale. The Russian Empire reintroduced this oilseed cultivation process to North America in the mid-20th century; North America began their commercial era of sunflower production and breeding. New breeds of the Helianthus spp. began to become more prominent in new geographical areas. During the 18th century, the use of sunflower oil became very popular in Russia, particularly with members of the Russian Orthodox Church, because only plant-based fats were allowed during Lent, according to fasting traditions. In the early 19th century, it was first commercialized in the village of Alexeyevka in Voronezh Governorate by the merchant named Daniil Bokaryov, who developed a technology suitable for its large-scale extraction, and quickly spread around. The town's coat of arms has included an image of a sunflower ever since.

=== Production ===
Sunflower seed production – 2024
Territory	(Millions of tonnes)
Russia	16.9
Ukraine	13
European Union	8.5
Argentina	4.5
Kazakhstan	1.83
China	1.75
Turkey	1.35
South Africa	0.77
World	51.9
Source: FAS of the USDA

In 2024, world production of sunflower seeds was 51.9 million tonnes, led by Russia and Ukraine, with 58% combined of the total.

=== Fertilizer use ===
Researchers have analyzed the impact of various nitrogen-based fertilizers on the growth of sunflowers. Ammonium nitrate was found to produce better nitrogen absorption than urea, which performed better in low-temperature areas.

=== Crop rotation ===
Sunflower cultivation typically uses crop rotation, often with cereals, soybean, or rapeseed. This reduces idle periods and increases total sunflower production and profitability.

=== Hybrids and cultivars ===
In today's market, most of the sunflower seeds provided or grown by farmers are hybrids. Hybrids or hybridized sunflowers are produced by cross-breeding different types and species, for example cultivated sunflowers with wild species. By doing so, new genetic recombinations are obtained ultimately leading to the production of new hybrid species. These hybrid species generally have a higher fitness and carry properties or characteristics that farmers look for, such as resistance to pathogens.

Hybrid, Helianthus annuus dwarf2 does not contain the hormone gibberellin and does not display heliotropic behavior. Plants treated with an external application of the hormone display a temporary restoration of elongation growth patterns. This growth pattern diminished by 35% 7–14 days after final treatment.

Hybrid male sterile and male fertile flowers that display heterogeneity have a low crossover of honeybee visitation. Sensory cues such as pollen odor, diameter of seed head, and height may influence pollinator visitation of pollinators that display constancy behavior patterns.

Sunflowers are grown as ornamentals in a domestic setting. Being easy to grow and producing spectacular results in any good, moist soil in full sun, they are a favourite subject for children. A large number of cultivars, of varying size and color, are now available to grow from seed. The following are cultivars of sunflowers (those marked agm have gained the Royal Horticultural Society's Award of Garden Merit):

- American Giant
- Arnika
- Autumn Beauty
- Aztec Sun
- Black Oil
- Chianti Hybrid
- Claret agm
- Dwarf Sunspot
- Evening Sun
- Florenza
- Giant Primrose
- Gullick's Variety agm
- Incredible
- Indian Blanket Hybrid
- Irish Eyes
- Italian White
- Kong Hybrid
- Large Grey Stripe
- Lemon Queen agm
- Loddon Gold agm
- Miss Mellish agm
- Monarch agm
- Mongolian Giant
- Moon-Walker
- Munchkin
- Orange Sun
- Pastiche agm
- Peach Passion
- Peredovik
- Prado Red
- Red Sun
- Ring of Fire
- Rostov
- Russian Giant
- Skyscraper
- Solar Eclipse
- Soraya
- Strawberry Blonde
- Sunny Hybrid
- Sunsation Yellow
- Sunshine
- Taiyo
- Tarahumara
- Teddy Bear agm
- Thousand Suns
- Titan
- Valentine agm
- Velvet Queen
- Yellow Disk
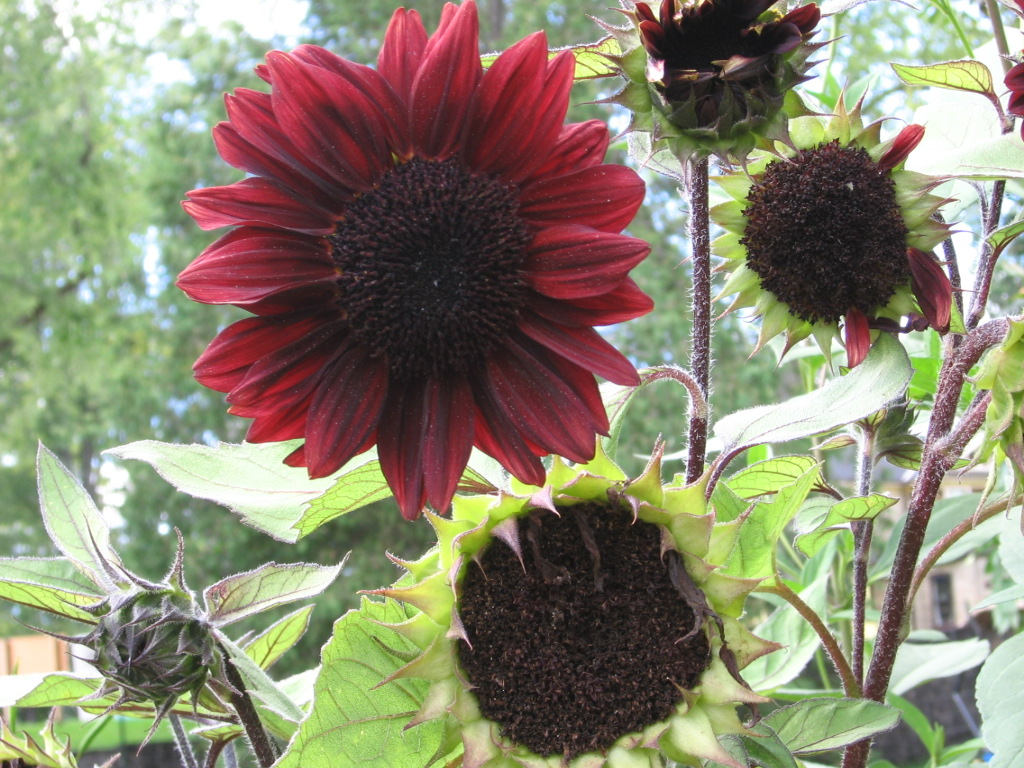
Prado Red

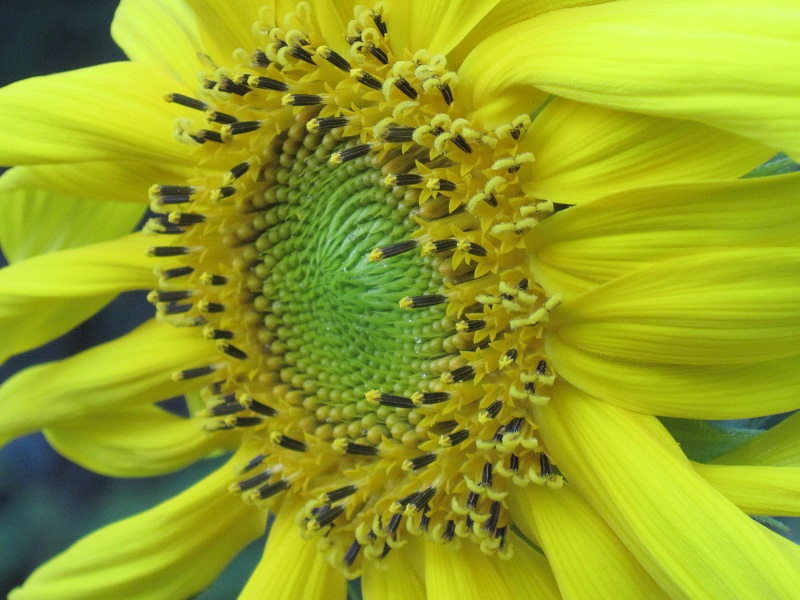
Mammoth Russian

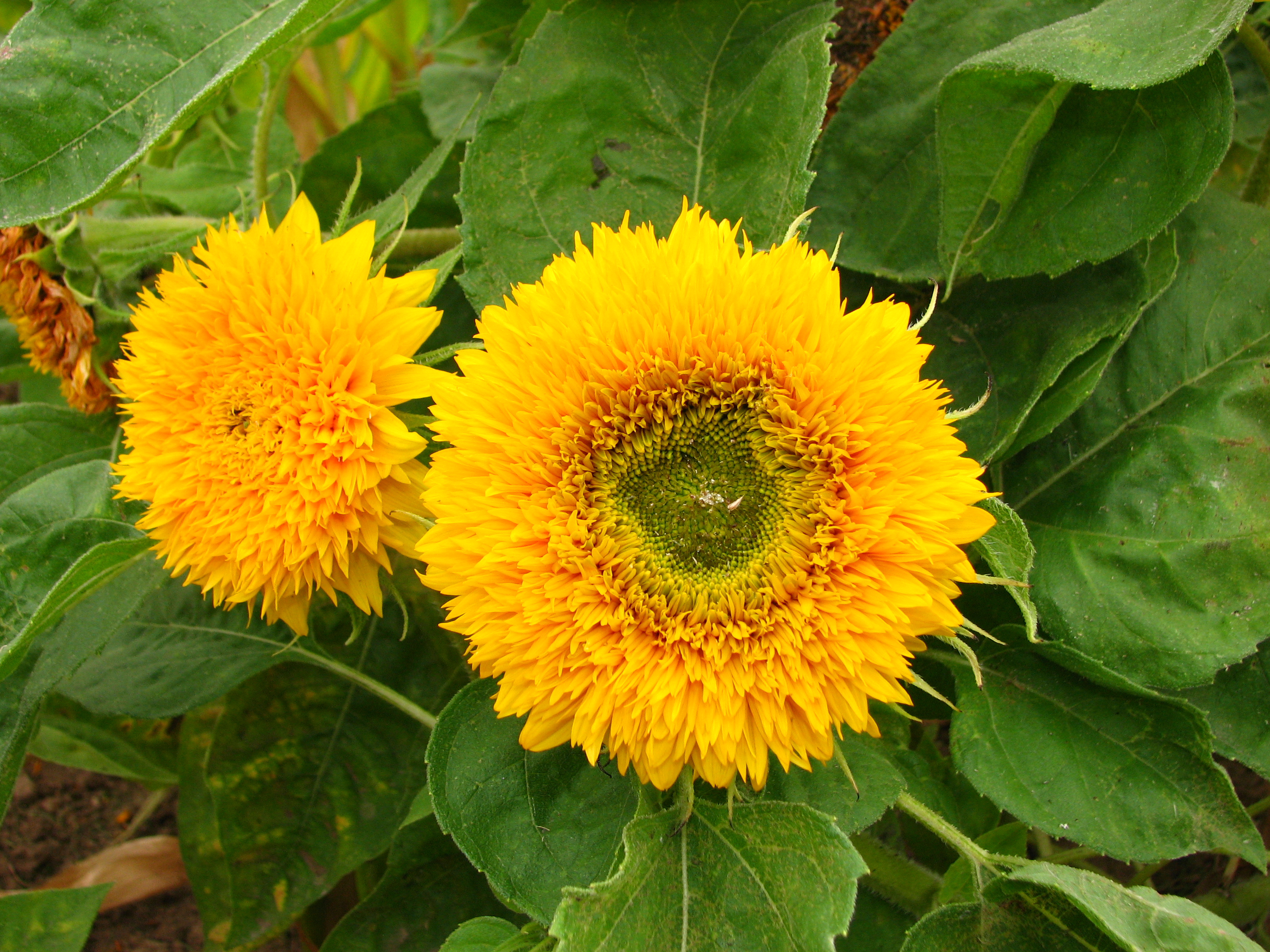
Teddy Bear

== Uses ==
Confectionary sunflower "whole seed" are sold as a snack food, raw or after roasting in ovens, with or without salt and/or seasonings added. Sunflower seeds can be processed into a peanut butter alternative, sunflower butter. It is also sold as food for birds and can be used directly in cooking and salads. Native Americans had multiple uses for sunflowers in the past, such as in bread, medical ointments, dyes and body paints.

Sunflower oil, extracted from the seeds of oil cultivars, is used for cooking, as a carrier oil and to produce margarine and biodiesel, as it is cheaper than olive oil. A range of sunflower varieties exist with differing fatty acid compositions; some "high-oleic" types contain a higher level of monounsaturated fats in their oil than even olive oil. The oil is also sometimes used in soap. After World War I, during the Russian Civil War, people in Ukraine used sunflower seed oil in lamps as a substitute for kerosene due to shortages. The light from such a lamp has been described as "miserable" and "smoky".

The cake remaining after the seeds have been processed for oil is used as livestock feed. The hulls resulting from the dehulling of the seeds before oil extraction can also be fed to domestic animals. Some recently developed cultivars have drooping heads. These cultivars are less attractive to gardeners growing the flowers as ornamental plants, but appeal to farmers, because they reduce bird damage and losses from some plant diseases. Sunflowers also produce latex, and are the subject of experiments to improve their suitability as an alternative crop for producing hypoallergenic rubber.

Traditionally, several Native American groups planted sunflowers on the north edges of their gardens as a "fourth sister" to the better-known three sisters combination of corn, beans, and squash. Annual species are often planted for their allelopathic properties. It was also used by Native Americans to dress hair. Among the Zuni people, the fresh or dried root is chewed by the medicine man before sucking venom from a snakebite and applying a poultice to the wound. This compound poultice of the root is applied with much ceremony to rattlesnake bites.

However, for commercial farmers growing other commodity crops, the wild sunflower is often considered a weed. Especially in the Midwestern US, wild (perennial) species are often found in corn and soybean fields and can decrease yields. The decrease in yield can be attributed to the production of phenolic compounds which are used to reduce competition for nutrients in nutrient-poor growing areas of the common sunflower.

=== Phytoremediation ===
Helianthus annuus can be used in phytoremediation to extract pollutants from soil such as lead and other heavy metals, such as cadmium, zinc, cesium, strontium, and uranium. The phytoremediation process begins by absorbing the heavy metal(s) through the roots, which gradually accumulate in other areas, such as the shoots and leaves. Helianthus annuus can also be used in rhizofiltration to neutralize radionuclides, such as caesium-137 and strontium-90, from contaminated water, as was done in the case of a pond after the Chernobyl disaster. A similar campaign was mounted in response to the Fukushima Daiichi nuclear disaster.

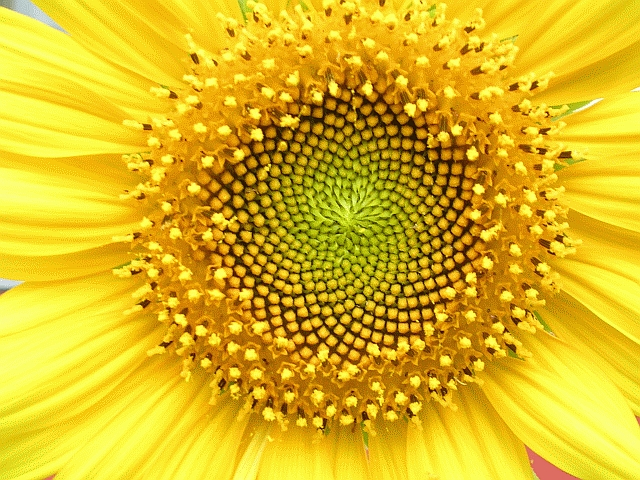
Head displaying florets in spirals of 34 and 55 around the outside

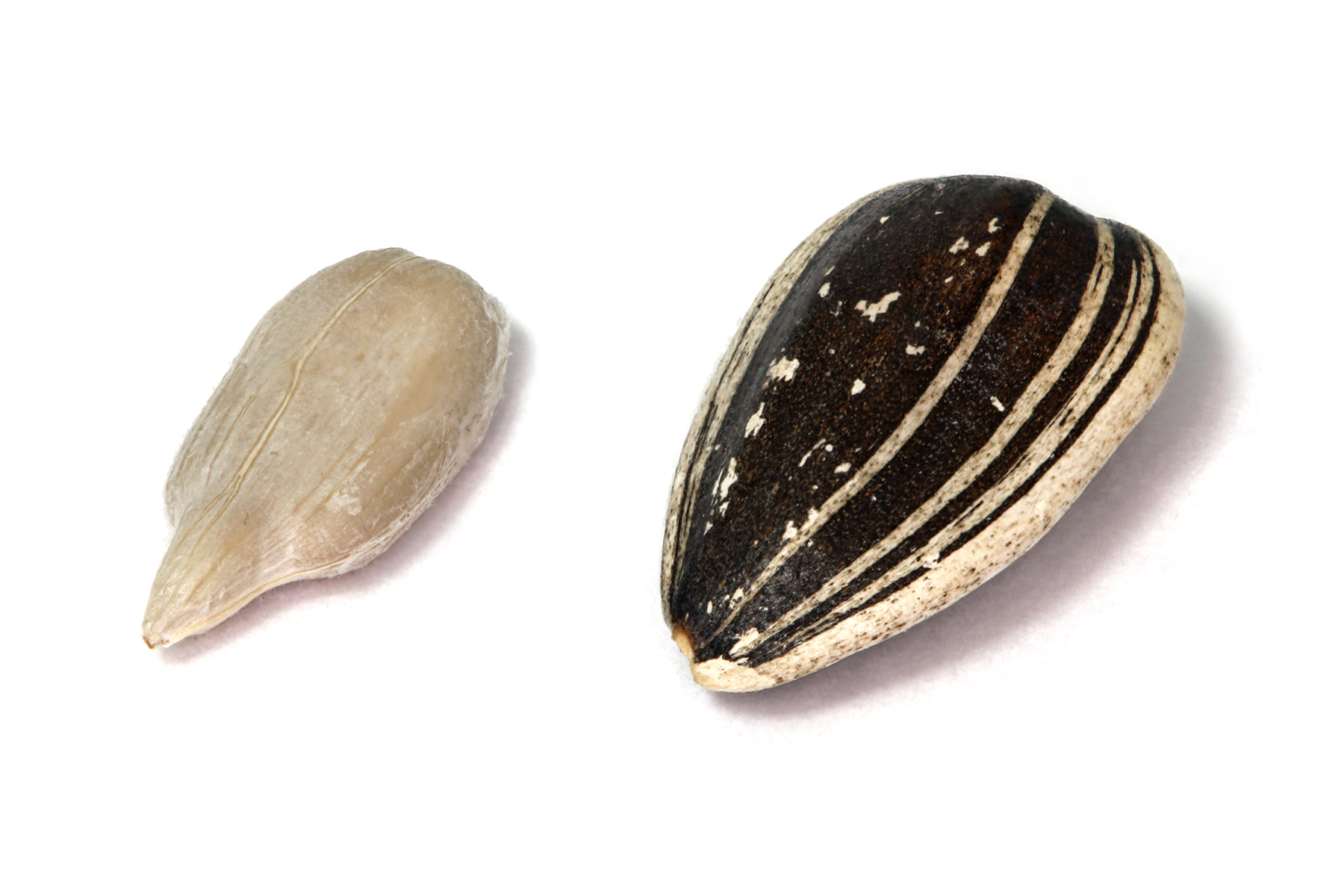
Seed dehulled (left) and with hull (right)

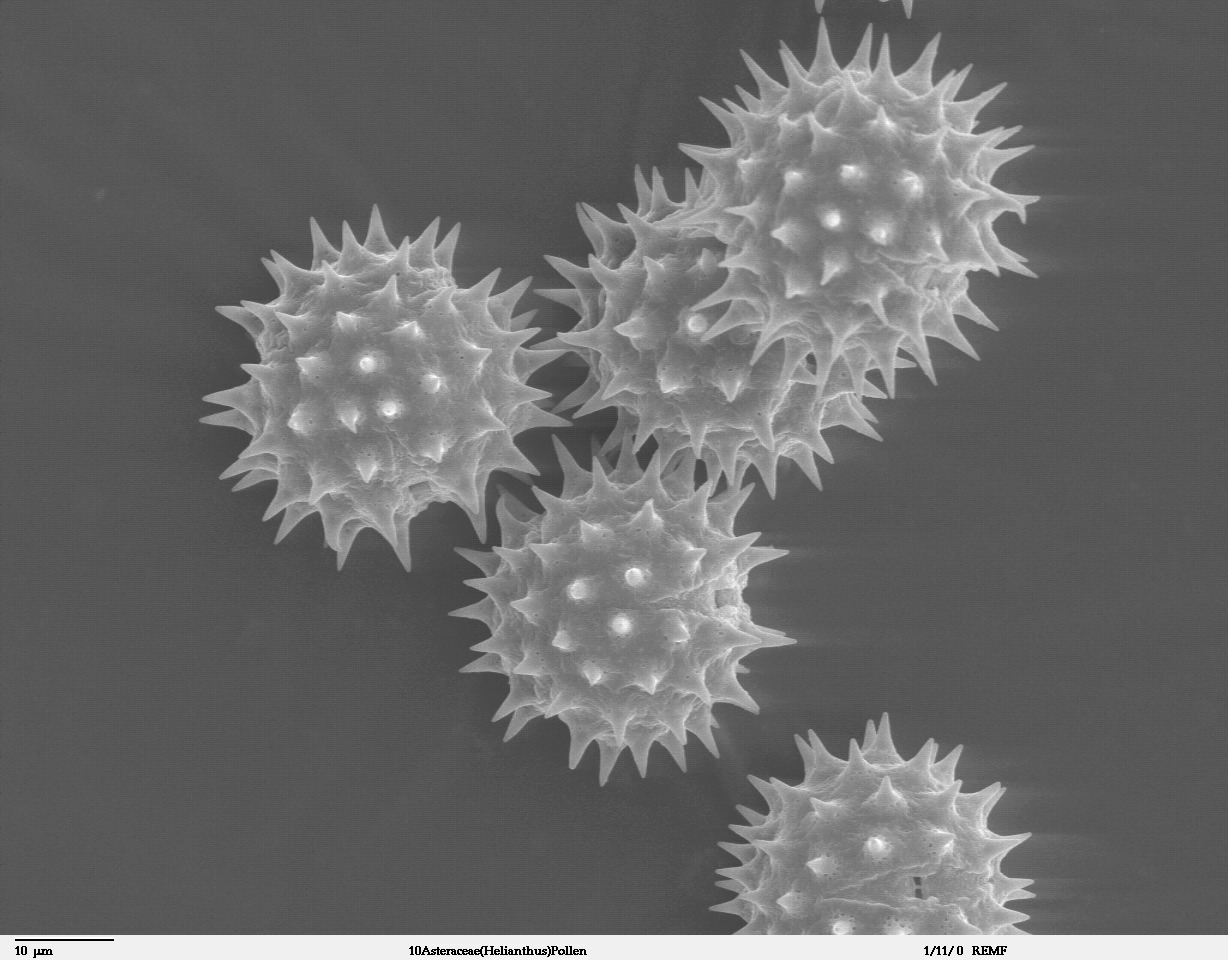
Pollen close-up

== In culture ==
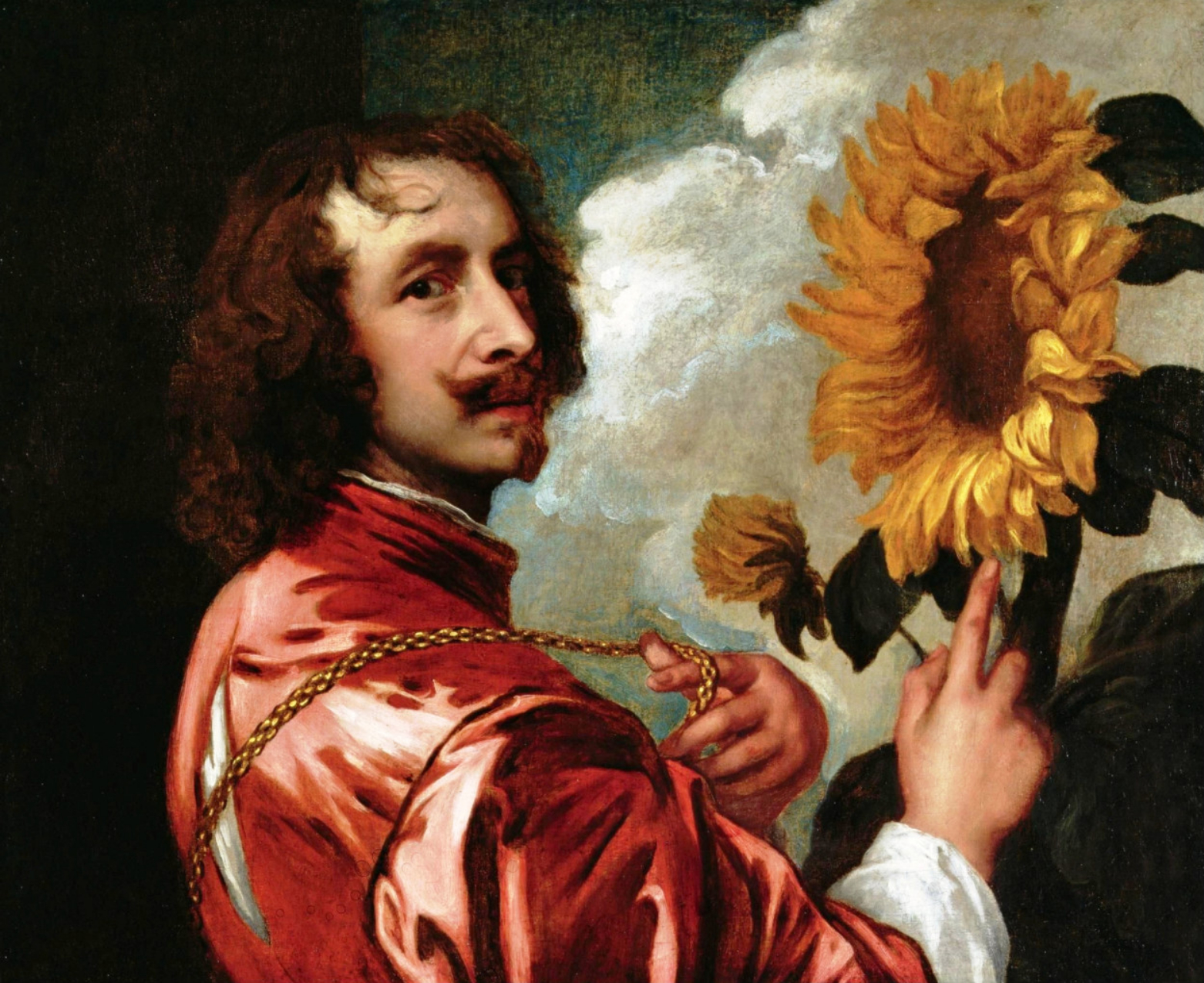
Anthony van Dyck with sunflower (c. 1633)

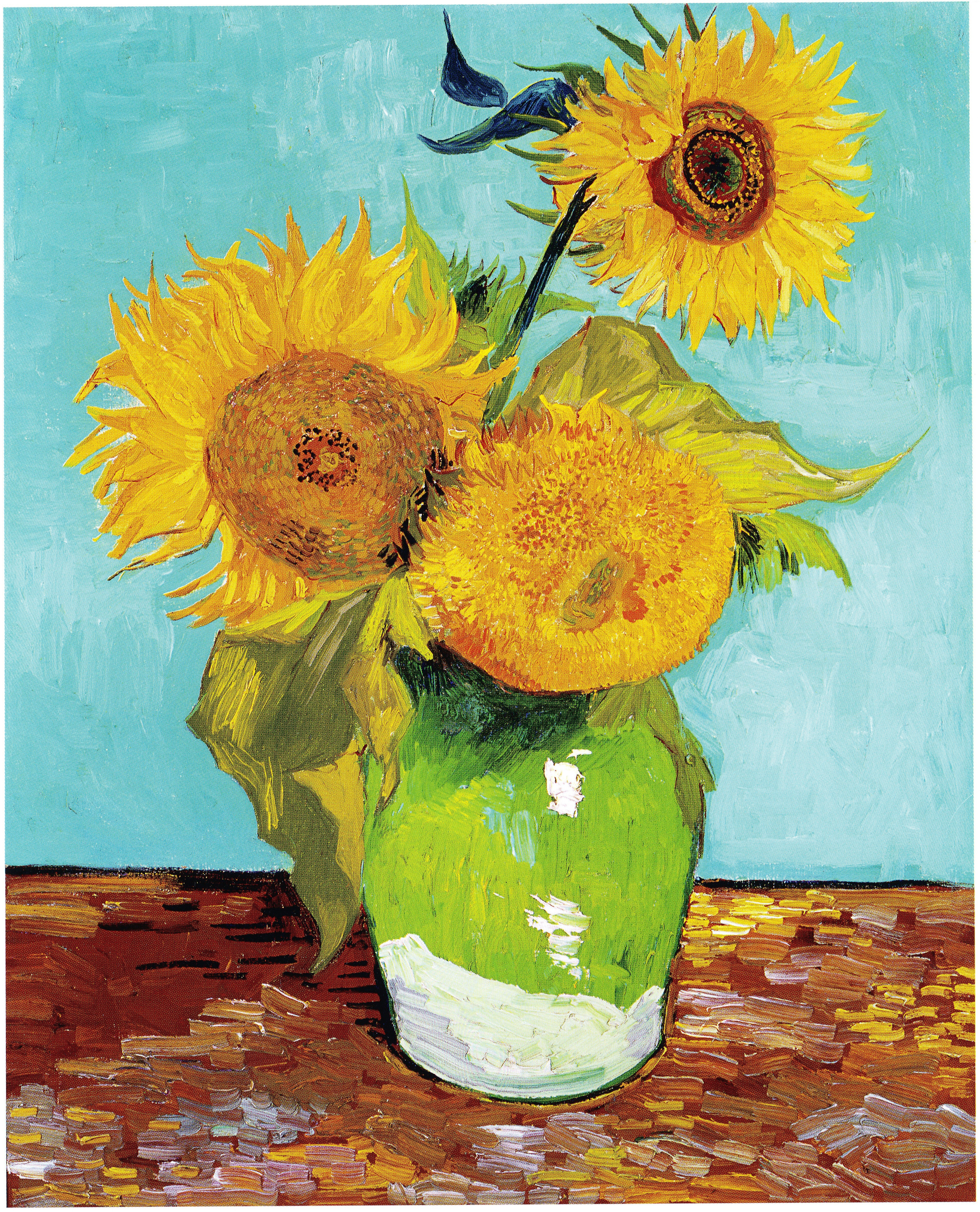
Vincent van Gogh – "Lausanne" Sunflowers (1888)

According to Haudenosaunee mythology, the first sunflowers grew out of Earth Woman's legs after she died giving birth to her twin sons, Sapling and Flint.

The Zuni people use the blossoms ceremonially for anthropic worship. Sunflowers were also worshipped by the Incas because they viewed it as a symbol for the Sun.

Stories of Clytie the nymph who was spurned by her former lover Helios end with her transformed into what may be translated as sunflower. However, the plant in Greek mythology may be, "partly pale and partly red, and very like a violet". The plant described also exhibits heliotropism, with its face turning towards the sun. This plant may be a species in the genus heliotrope (Heliotropium). However, less commonly it is identified as the common marigold (Calendula officinalis).

During the 19th century, it was believed that nearby plants of the species would protect a home from malaria. The flowers are the subject of Vincent van Gogh's Sunflowers series of still-life paintings.

In July 2015, viable seeds were acquired from the field where Malaysia Airlines Flight 17 crashed on a year earlier and were grown in tribute to the 15 Dutch residents of Hilversum who were killed. Earlier that year, Fairfax chief correspondent Paul McGeough and photographer Kate Geraghty had collected 1.5 kg of sunflower seeds from the wreck site for family and friends of the 38 Australian victims, who aimed to give them a poignant symbol of hope.

On 13 May 2021, during the National Costume competition of the Miss Universe 2020 beauty pageant, Miss Dominican Republic Kimberly Jiménez wore a "Goddess of Sunflowers" costume covered in gold and yellow rhinestones that included several real sunflowers sewn onto the fabric.

=== Symbolism ===
The sunflower is the national flower of Ukraine. Ukrainians used sunflower as a main source of cooking oil instead of butter or lard forbidden by the Orthodox Church when observing Lent. They were also planted to serve as bioremediation in Chernobyl. In June 1996, U.S., Russian, and Ukrainian officials planted sunflowers at the Pervomaysk missile base where Soviet nuclear weapons were formerly placed. During the Russian invasion of Ukraine, a video widely shared on social media showed a Ukrainian woman confronting a Russian soldier, telling the latter to "take these seeds and put them in your pockets so at least sunflowers will grow when you all lie down here". The sunflower has since become a global symbol of resistance, unity, and hope.

The sunflower is also the state flower of the U.S. state of Kansas and one of the city flowers of Kitakyūshū, Japan.

During the late 19th century, the flower was used as the symbol of the Aesthetic Movement.

The sunflower was chosen as the symbol of the Spiritualist Church, for many reasons, but mostly because of the belief that the flowers turn toward the sun as "Spiritualism turns toward the light of truth". Modern Spiritualists often have art or jewelry with sunflower designs.

The sunflower is often used as a symbol of green ideology. The flower is also the symbol of the Vegan Society.

The sunflower is the symbol behind the Sunflower Movement, a 2014 mass protest in Taiwan.

The Hidden Disabilities Sunflower was first used as a visible symbol (typically worn on a lanyard) in May 2016 at London Gatwick Airport. It has since come into common usage throughout the UK and in the Commonwealth more generally.

Sunflowers were also used for cultural beliefs for many Native American Tribes. For the Hopi tribe, a big sunflower bloom meant there would be a good harvest year. The Teton Dakota tribe believed that when sunflowers were tall and blooming, it would be a good hunting season for buffalo. The Onandaga tribe had sunflowers in their creation story.
