= Taryenyawagon =

Taryenyawagon (Mohawk: Teharonhiawá:kon, Oneida: tehaluhyawá·ku, Onondaga: Taiñhiawa'geh, Tuscarora: Tharęhyawáˀkę) or "Holder of the Heavens" is the creator deity in Haudenosaunee mythology. He is often considered to be synonymous with Hahgwehdiyu.
