= Yuma creation myth =

The Yuma creation myth comes from the Yuma people, or Quechan, living in southern Arizona. The Yuma developed a pictographic system that were probably older than the Egyptian hieroglyphics. The early Yuma people probably worshiped in caves, and many pictographs show scenes from nature, trading and mythology. In the beginning of the Creation myth of the Yuma, there was nothing but water. Then Kokomaht came up out of the water. Bakohtal was born out of the water too, but he was forever blind because of a lie Kokomaht told him. Kokomaht said, "I opened my eyes when I was underwater." but this was a lie. Once the twins were born Bakohtal tried to create humans but they were not right. Instead of feet and hands they had lumps, but Bakohtal, being blind, thought it was perfect. However Kokomaht made a truly perfect being out of mud. He waved it four times toward the north and it stood on its feet. Then Kokomaht created the earth on top of the frog, Hanyi. Once he was finished and had made Komastam'hó, his son, he knew that his work was done, so he laid down on the earth and Hanyi sucked the breath out of him. Komashtam'hó made a sun and moon and smothered it with his spit, and told the people, "Look this is the sun, it will give you warmth and peace." Before Komashtam'hó made a great flood, animals were people. Then Komashtam'hó ordered everybody to shave their hair.

== The Great Flood ==
Komashtam'hó was displeased with the fact that the animal people did not look good with their hair cut, so he changed them into animals. However the newly formed animals were violent and dangerous so he sent a great flood. After a long time, Markohuvek, a person, asked Komashtam'hó why he was making a great flood. Komashtam'hó replied to Markohuvek that he was trying to protect the people from the newly formed animals. Markohuvek replied that gradually people would freeze to death since there wasn't any fire. So Komastam'hó made a great fire to evaporate the water. However he made it accidentally too hot and he was slightly burned. Komashtam'hó then took a giant pole and smashed the house of his father. Water welling from the house became the Colorado River. And in it swam fish, eels, and other water animals. These were the beings created by Bakotahl. As for Bakotahl, he lays under the earth, and when there is an earthquake, the Yuma say, "It is the Blind Evil One stirring down below."
