= Flint (Native American mythology) =

Flint, (Note: Mohawk: Shawískara or Okarahtsikó:wa transl. Great Swampy Elm, or Hatowi; Oneida: Shakohlewáthaˀ; Onondaga: Ohá·äʼ; Cayuga: otragwę́ˀdaˀ; Seneca: Otögwë’da’; Tuscarora: Kaˀtikęhrá·ksę· transl. Bad Mind) also known as Hahgwehdaetgah, is the Haudenosaunee god of darkness and evil and the twin brother of Hahgwehdiyu (Sapling or Skyholder). The brothers are sons or grandsons (by her daughter Tekawerahkwa, the Earth Woman) of Atahensic, the Sky Woman. While Hahgwehdiyu was born normally, Flint killed his mother in childbirth by emerging from her armpit.

To the Haudenosaunee, the twins are creator gods and played a major role in the formation of the Earth. According to some versions the twins created humankind together, explaining why people can be both good and evil or creative and destructive. In other versions his brother alone was the creator of humans while Flint was the god of death.

== In Haudenosaunee mythology ==
The twins were born to either Sky Woman or her daughter Earth Woman on the island on the turtle's back in the midst of a primordial sea. When he and his brother are born, Flint kills his mother by emerging from her armpit or navel. Flint is left-handed while his brother is right-handed. In some myths, Flint deceives his grandmother into believing his brother was the killer, and his brother is shunned by her.

As they mature, Flint and his brother continue their mother's work of creating the earth. Hahgwehdiyu creates good things like medicines and rivers, and Flint creating dangerous and destructive things, such as diseases and river rapids. Versions differ on whether one twin or both created humans. Some stories describe a final battle between the two twins, where Hahgwehdiyu defeats Flint and imprisons or banishes him, while others describe Flint and his brother existing in cosmic balance despite competition between them, with both light and darkness being necessary for life.

== In Algonquian mythology ==
A version of Flint also features in the mythologies of the Algonquian peoples. Flint is less prominent in Algonquian mythology, but is sometimes described as the brother of the Anishinaabe hero Nanabozho or the Wabanaki hero Glooscap. In Algonquian legends, Flint does not generally commit any further crimes or problems other than the death of his mother whom he killed in childbirth by intentionally cutting his way out rather than waiting to be born. In some stories the culture hero kills him to avenge their mother's death in childbirth, but in other stories Flint remains as one of the seasonal or directional demigods.
