= Hahgwehdiyu =

Haudenosaunee god of goodness and light

Hahgwehdiyu, (Note: Tuscarora: Kaˀtikęhrákwahst transl. Good Mind) also known as Skyholder (Note: Mohawk: Teharonhiawá:kon; Oneida: tehaluhyawá·ku; Onondaga: Thayęhya·wáʼgih; Seneca: Ha:gëöya’gewa’kö or Seneca: Táö́yáwa’göh; Tuscarora: Tharęhyawáˀkę) or Sapling (Note: Mohawk: Kanehtó:ton; Onondaga: Odędųníʼah) among other names (Note: including Good Mind, Ha-Wen-Neyu, Rawenniyo, Hawenniyo, Teharonhiakwako, Taryenyawagon) is the Haudenosaunee god of goodness and light, as well as a creator god. (Note: Mohawk: Shonkwaya’tishon; Oneida: Shukwayaˀtísu; Onondaga: Shoñgwaya’dihsá’ih, Ho’shasdeñhse·wá·neñh, or Shoñgwa·de·yeñnó’kda’; Cayuga: Shǫgwaya̱ˀdíhsˀǫh; Seneca: Shögwajë́:no’kdá’öh or Hojë:nó’kda’öh; Tuscarora: Tharęhyawáˀkę) He and his twin brother Hahgwehdaetgah or Flint, the god of darkness, were either children or grandchildren (by her daughter Tekawerahkwa the Earth Woman) of Atahensic the Sky Woman.

The story of the Twins (Note: Mohawk: Tehníkhen) varies widely among the Haudenosaunee, but generally follows a similar pattern. While Hahgwehdiyu was born normally, Hahgwehdaetgah killed his mother in childbirth by emerging from her armpit or navel. In versions where Sky Woman is their grandmother, Hahgwehdaetgah lies to her, telling her that Hahgwehdiyu killed their mother, and is favored by Sky Woman during their upbringing.

The two have great creative powers and begin to exert influence on the world. Hahgwehdiyu creates land from his own body and that of his mother's. His outstretched palm became the sky, his mother's head the sun, and her breasts became the moon and stars. He made her body the earth, into which he planted a seed, which grew into the maize plant. Hahgwehdaetgah created destructive and dangerous things. Sources disagree on which twin creates humans. In some versions, Hahgwehdaetgah is defeated by Hahgwehdiyu, who goes on to instruct humans on ceremonies and religion. Other versions describe Flint and his brother existing in cosmic balance despite competition between them, with both light and darkness being necessary for life.

== Creation of The Earth ==
Many different versions of this creation story exist. This version of the story is taken from (Converse 1908).

The Oeh-dah (Note: Onondaga: Ųhwę́·jya’; Cayuga: Ohéhdaˀ; Seneca: óéhda’ or Seneca: Yöëdza’) (Earth) was a thought in the mind of the ruler on a great island floating above the clouds. This ruler was called by various names, among them Ha-wen-ni-yu, (Note: Onondaga: Hawę·ní·yo’; Cayuga: Hawę:ní:yo: Seneca: Hawëni:yo’) meaning He who governs or The Ruler. The island is a place of calm where all needs are provided and there is no pain or death. On this island grew a great apple (Note: Parker says "The central tree in the heaven world was the apple." The apple tree was introduced by European settlers. Elsewhere he suggests that the crab apple ("wild-apple") is meant.) tree where the inhabitants held council. The Ruler said "let us make a new place where another people can grow. Under our council tree is a great sea of clouds which calls out for light." He ordered the council tree to be uprooted and he looked down into the depths. He had Atahensic, (Note: Parker says: "Ata'-en'sic ... is the Huron name for the first mother, and not that of the (confederated) Iroquois, The Senecas usually give this character no name other than Ea-gen’-tci, literally old woman or ancient bodied. This name is not a personal one, however. Mrs Converse has therefore substituted the Huronian personal name for the Iroquoian common name.") Sky Woman, look down. He heard the voice of the sea calling; he told Atahensic, who was pregnant, to bring it life. He wrapped her in light and dropped her down through the hole.

She was carried down to the waters by a flock of birds and placed on the back of a turtle. The water animals worked to bring some soil to the surface, the soil was placed on the back of the turtle and grew to become the island, Oeh-dah. Atahensic heard two voices under her heart and knew her time had come. One voice was calm and quiet, but the other was loud and angry. These were the Do-yo-da-no, The Twins. The good twin, Hahgwehdiyu or Teharonhiakwako (transl. Sapling), was born normally; the evil twin, Hahgwehdaetgah or Sawiskera (transl. Flint), forced his way out from under his mother's arm, killing her during childbirth.

After the death of Sky Woman, the island was shrouded in gloom. Hahgwehdiyu shaped the sky and created the sun from his mother's face saying "you shall rule here where your face will shine forever." Hahgwehdaetgah, however, set the great darkness in the west to drive down the sun. Hahgwehdiyu then took the Moon and Stars from his mother's breast, and placed them, his sisters, to guard the night sky. He gave his mother's body to the earth, the Great Mother from whom all life came.

There is another version of the myth of Hahgwehdiyu in which he and Hahgwehdaetgah are Atahensic's grandsons instead. According to this variant, Atahensic had a daughter named Tekawerahkwa (transl. Earth Woman), whom the west wind impregnated with Hahgwehdiyu and Hahgwehdaetgah. As Tekawerahkwa died by childbirth, either she wished for her body to sustain the people or Atahensic sowed on her grave the seeds she had brought when she fell to Earth, but never planted before. Out of Tekawerahkwa's remains grew various plants: the sister spirits of the corn, beans, and squash came from her breasts, hands, and navel respectively; sunflowers from her legs; strawberries from her heart; tobacco from her head; and purple potatoes or sunchokes from her feet.

Hahgwehdiyu, corresponding to the Huron spirit Iosheka, created the first people. He healed disease, defeated demons, and gave many of the Iroquois magical and ceremonial rituals. Another of his gifts was tobacco, which has been used as a central part of the Iroquois religion.

Hahgwehdiyu is aided by a number of assistant or subordinate spirits.
