= Ernest Smith (artist) =

Native American artist

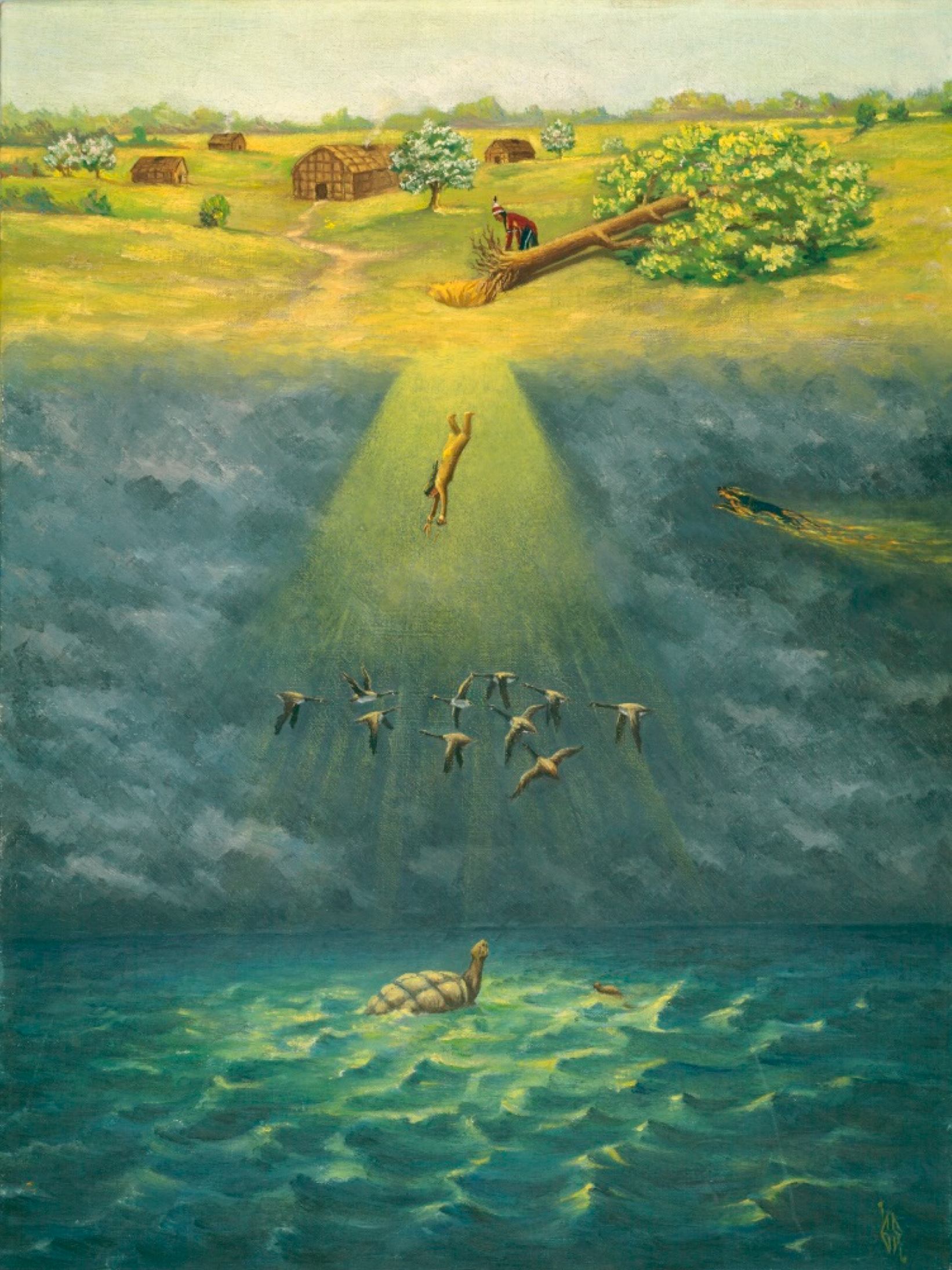
Sky Woman (1936)

Ernest Peter Smith (October 28, 1907 – February 25, 1975) was a Native American artist from the Tonawanda Seneca Nation. Smith painted mostly traditional Seneca myths and stories of daily life in the Seneca village he grew up in. In the 1930s Smith produced a large series of paintings documenting Seneca life, as part of the WPA Indian Art Project.

== Early life and career ==
Ernest Smith was born and raised on the Tonawanda Reservation, a son of Louisa (née Sundown) and Peter S. Smith. He was the youngest of seven children and a member of the Heron Clan. In his childhood, Smith began to teach himself how to draw and paint, but he left school before he could graduate to help support his family.

Smith first became known as an artist when anthropologist Arthur C. Parker hired him to be a part of the WPA Indian Arts Project around 1935, which was sponsored by the Rochester Municipal Museum. He joined Jesse Cornplanter and Samford Plummer as the most prolific Haudenosaunee artists who were a part of this anthropological project. As part of the project, Smith created a mural at the Rochester Museum and Science Center.

== Collections ==
- National Museum of the American Indian
- Rochester Museum and Science Center
- National Anthropological Archives of the Smithsonian Institution
