= Three Sisters (agriculture) =

Agricultural technique of Indigenous people in the Americas

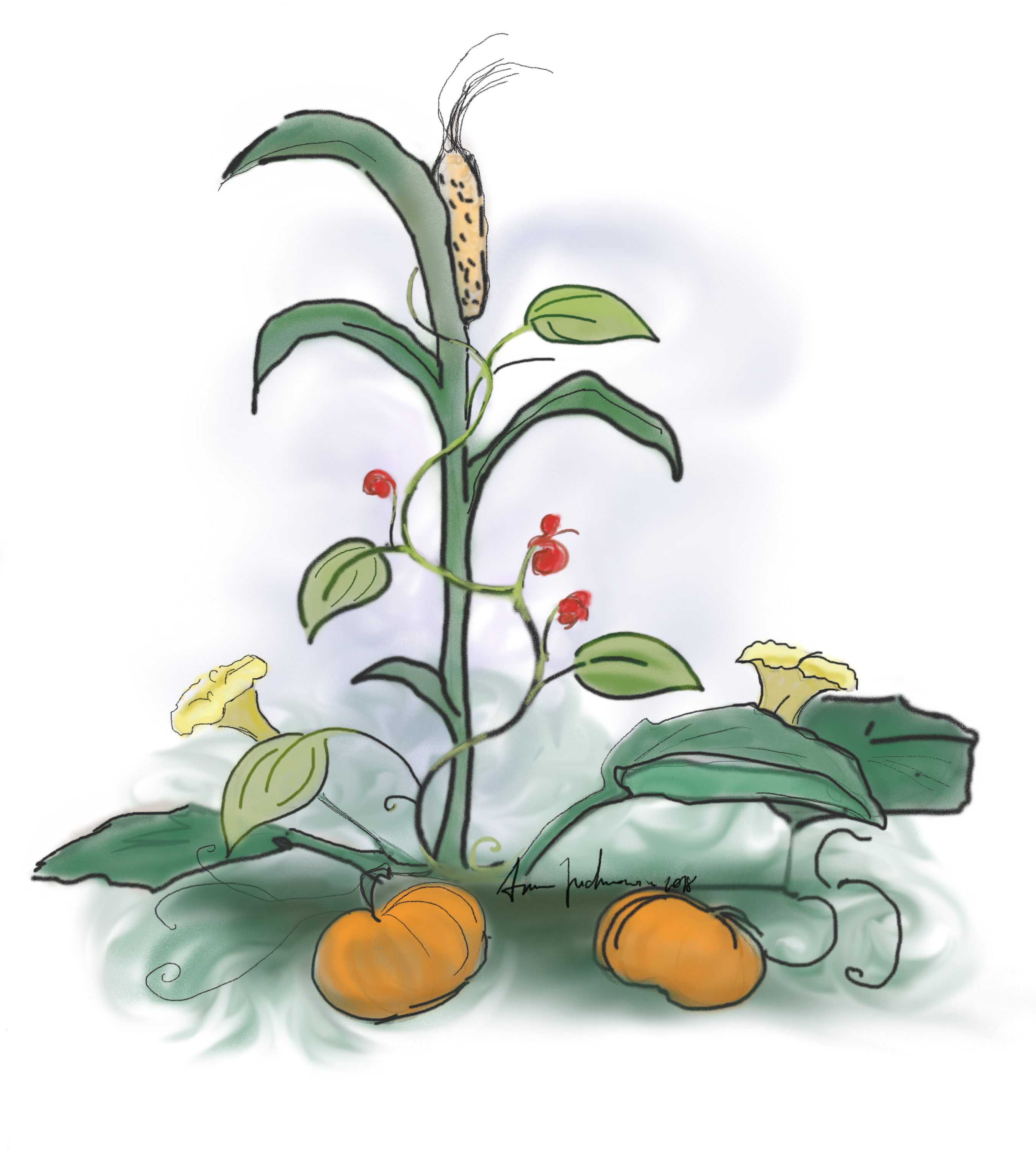
An illustration of maize, climbing beans, and winter squash planted together

The Three Sisters (Spanish: tres hermanas) are the three main agricultural crops of various indigenous peoples of Central and North America. The crops are squash, maize, and climbing beans (typically tepary beans or common beans). Traditionally, several Native American groups also planted sunflowers on the north edges of their gardens as a "fourth sister". In a technique known as companion planting, the maize and beans are often planted together in mounds formed by hilling soil around the base of the plants each year; squash is typically planted between the mounds. The cornstalk serves as a trellis for climbing beans, the beans fix nitrogen in their root nodules and stabilize the maize in high winds, and the wide leaves of the squash plant shade the ground, keeping the soil moist and helping prevent the establishment of weeds.

Indigenous peoples throughout North America cultivated different varieties of the Three Sisters, adapted to varying local environments. The individual crops and their use in polyculture originated in Mesoamerica, where squash was domesticated first approximately 10,000 years ago, followed by maize and then beans, over a period of 5,000–6,500 years. European records from the sixteenth century describe highly productive Indigenous agriculture based on cultivation of the Three Sisters throughout what are now the Eastern United States and Canada, where the crops were used for both food and trade. Geographer Carl O. Sauer described the Three Sisters as "a symbiotic plant complex of North and Central America without an equal elsewhere".

== Cultivation methods ==
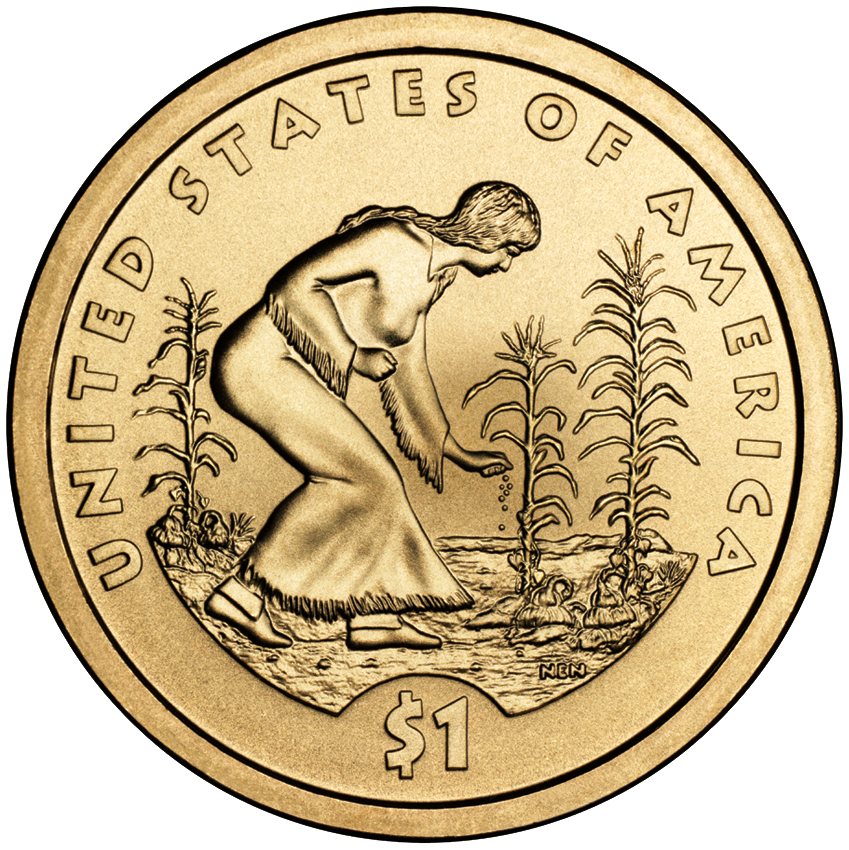
The Three Sisters planting method is featured on the reverse of the 2009 US Native American dollar.

Agricultural history in the Americas differed from the Old World in that the Americas lacked large-seeded, easily domesticated grains (such as wheat and barley) and large domesticated animals that could be used for agricultural labor. At the time of first contact between the Europeans and the Americans, Carlos Sempat Assadourian writes that Europeans practiced "extensive agriculture, based on the plough and draught animals" while the Indigenous peoples of the Americas practiced "intensive agriculture, based on human labour".

In Indigenous American companion planting, maize (Zea mays), beans (wild beans and vetches spp.), and squash (Cucurbita pepo) are planted close together. The maize and beans are often planted together in mounds formed by hilling soil around the base of the plants each year; squash is typically planted between the mounds. In the northeastern U.S., this practice increases soil temperature in the mound and improves drainage, both of which benefit maize planted in spring. In Haudenosaunee or Iroquois farming, the fields were not tilled, enhancing soil fertility and the sustainability of the cropping system by limiting soil erosion and oxidation of soil organic matter. A modern experiment found that the Haudenosaunee Three Sisters polyculture provided both more energy and more protein than any local monoculture.

The three crops benefit by being grown together. The cornstalk serves as a trellis for the beans to climb; the beans fix nitrogen in the soil and their twining vines stabilize the maize in high winds; and the wide leaves of the squash plant shade the ground, keeping the soil moist and helping prevent the establishment of weeds. The prickly hairs of some squash varieties deter pests, such as deer and raccoons.

Although this synergy had been traditionally reputed among American cultures, scientific confirmation has arrived only much more recently. Much of this research was performed in the Soviet Union in the early 1970s and published in several volumes of Biochemical and Physiological Bases for Plant Interactions in Phytocenosis edited by Andrey Mikhailovich Grodzinsky. Dzubenko & Petrenko 1971, Lykhvar & Nazarova 1970 and Pronin et al. 1970 find a wide number of leguminous crops increase the growth and yield of maize, while Gulyaev et al. 1970 select later maturing lines of beans to produce the converse effect, increasing even further the yield gain of beans when planted with maize. Pronin et al. 1972 find increased productivity and root exudate in both crops when combining faba beans with maize, and even more so in soils with preexisting high nitrogen fixing microorganism activity.

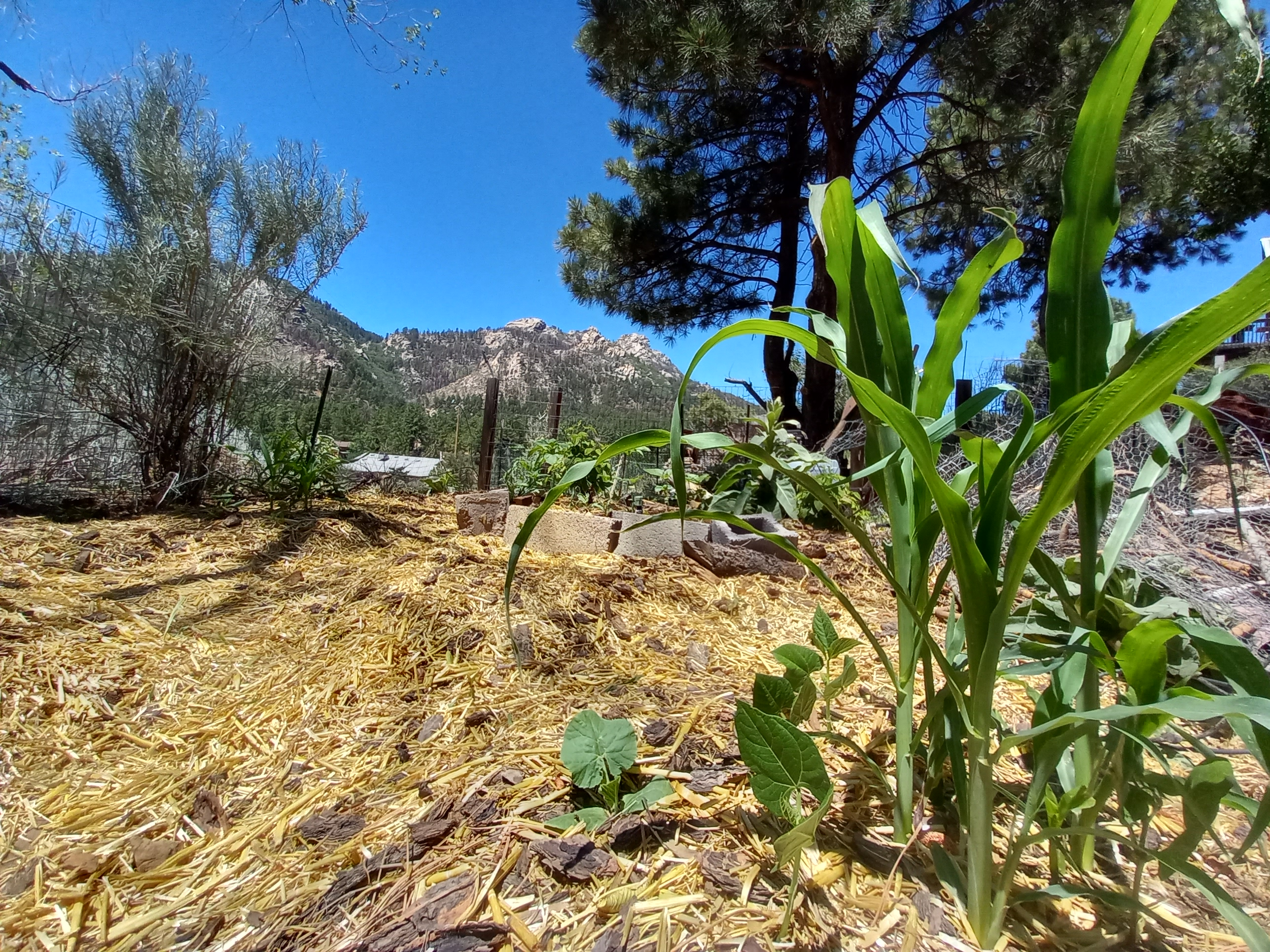
Three Sisters mound planting in Arizona, 2022

Indigenous peoples throughout North America cultivated different varieties of the Three Sisters, adapted to varying local environments. The milpas of Mesoamerica are farms or gardens that employ companion planting on a larger scale. The Ancestral Puebloans adopted this garden design in the drier deserts and xeric shrublands environment. The Tewa and other peoples of the North American Southwest often included a "fourth Sister", the Rocky Mountain beeplant, which attracts bees to help pollinate the beans and squash. The Three Sisters crop model was widely used by a number of First Nations in the Great Lakes–St. Lawrence Lowlands region.

== Productivity ==
While this practice is often cited as a way to improve small gardens for individual use, its historical value lay in larger-scale implementations designed to nurture and sustain entire communities. European records from the sixteenth century describe highly productive Indigenous agriculture based on cultivation of the Three Sisters throughout what are now the Eastern United States and Canada, from Florida to Ontario. The agronomist Jane Mt. Pleasant writes that the Three Sisters mound system "enhances the soil physical and biochemical environment, minimizes soil erosion, improves soil tilth, manages plant population and spacing, provides for plant nutrients in appropriate quantities, and at the time needed, and controls weeds". After several thousand years of selective breeding, the hemisphere's most important crop, maize, was more productive than Old World grain crops. Maize produced two and one-half times more calories per given land area than wheat and barley.

Nutritionally, maize, beans, and squash contain all nine essential amino acids. The protein from maize is further enhanced by protein contributions from beans and pumpkin seeds, while pumpkin flesh provides large amounts of vitamin A. With the Three Sisters, farmers harvest about the same amount of energy as from maize monoculture, but get more protein yield from the inter-planted bean and pumpkin. Mt. Pleasant writes that this largely explains the value of the Three Sisters over monoculture cropping, as the system yields large amounts of energy, and at the same time increases protein yields; this polyculture cropping system yielded more food and supported more people per hectare compared to monocultures of the individual crops or mixtures of monocultures.

=== Yields ===
Scholars Mt. Pleasant and Burt reproduced Haudenosaunee methods of cultivation with Haudenosaunee varieties of maize at several locations in New York. They reported maize yields of 22 to 76 bushels per acre (1.4 to 4.8 tonnes per hectare). Soil fertility and weather were the main determinants of yield. Mt. Pleasant also questioned the conventional wisdom that the Haudenosaunee practiced slash-and-burn agriculture, abandoning fields when the soil was depleted of nutrients after several years of farming, but instead claimed that Haudenosaunee no-till farming techniques preserved soil fertility. In a similar experiment to reproduce Native American agricultural practices in Pakistan, Indian regions such as the Northern Plains where a mixture of intensive and extensive farming is practiced, Munson-Scullin and Scullin reported that over three years, the per-acre annual maize yields declined from 40 to 30 to 25 bushels (2.5, 1.9, and 1.6 t/ha).

Other scholars have estimated lower average yields of maize. Hart and Feranec estimated the yield of Wendat (Huron) agriculture at 8 to 22 bushels per acre (0.5 to 1.4 t/ha), the higher yields coming from newly cultivated land. The Wendat lived in Ontario near the northern limit of where agriculture was feasible and had less fertile soils than many other regions. Nevertheless, they produced surpluses for trading with nearby non-agricultural peoples. Bruce Trigger estimates that the Wendat required .4 to .8 acres (1,600 to 3,200 m^{2}) of land under cultivation per capita for their subsistence with more cultivated land required for trade. Sissel Schroeder estimates that the average yield of Native American farms in the 19th century was 18.9 bushels per acre (1.2 t/ha), but opines that pre-historic yields might have been as low as 10 bushels per acre (0.6 t/ha). As the Haudenosaunee and other Native Americans did not plow their land, Mt. Pleasant and Burt concluded that their lands retained more organic matter and thus were higher in yields of maize than early Euro-American farms in North America.

== Society and culture ==
Maize, beans, and squash, whether grown individually or together, have a very long history in the Americas. The process to develop the agricultural knowledge for cultivation took place over a 5,000 to 6,500 year period. Squash was domesticated first, with maize second and beans third. Squash was first domesticated some 8,000–10,000 years ago.

The Three Sisters model was not just a means for modeling a specific intercropping practice but has been a significant cultural and spiritual construct for the communities involved. The model has been studied and described by scholars in anthropology, history, agriculture, and food studies.

=== Cahokian, Mississippian and Muscogee culture ===
From 800 AD, Three Sisters crop organization was used in the largest Native American city north of the Rio Grande known as Cahokia, located in the Mississippi floodplain to the east of modern St. Louis, Missouri. It spanned over 13 square kilometres (5.0 mi^{2}) and supported populations of at least thousands. Cahokia was notable for its delineated community zones, including those for administration, several residential areas, and a large agricultural complex. Domesticated squash, gourds, and maize were initially grown alongside wild beans; domesticated beans were not grown at Cahokia until 1250. The cultivation of the Three Sisters crops by Cahokian residents produced a food surplus large enough to support Cahokia's expanded population, as well as further cultures throughout the extended Mississippi River system such as those of the Mississippian and Muscogee.

There is evidence that Cahokia held at least one great feast around 1050-1100 AD. The food served at these gatherings included, alongside a variety of other plants and animals, several domesticated squash varieties, maize, and wild beans. Food that needed to be processed, like cornmeal, would commonly be prepared at the feast site alongside non-food items that gave the feasts ritual or ceremonial importance.

Eventual overuse of the environment in the areas surrounding Cahokia began to degrade the land. As the surrounding woodlands were cleared through overuse, runoff frequently flooded the crop fields throughout the growing season, limiting the ability to grow the squash, maize, and corn Cahokia subsisted upon. By c. 1350, the Cahokia site had been mostly abandoned and the large population dispersed, though the Mississippian and Muscogee cultures continued to thrive until c. 1600, when contact with Spanish explorers brought Eurasian diseases, death, and cultural collapse.

=== Haudenosaunee culture ===
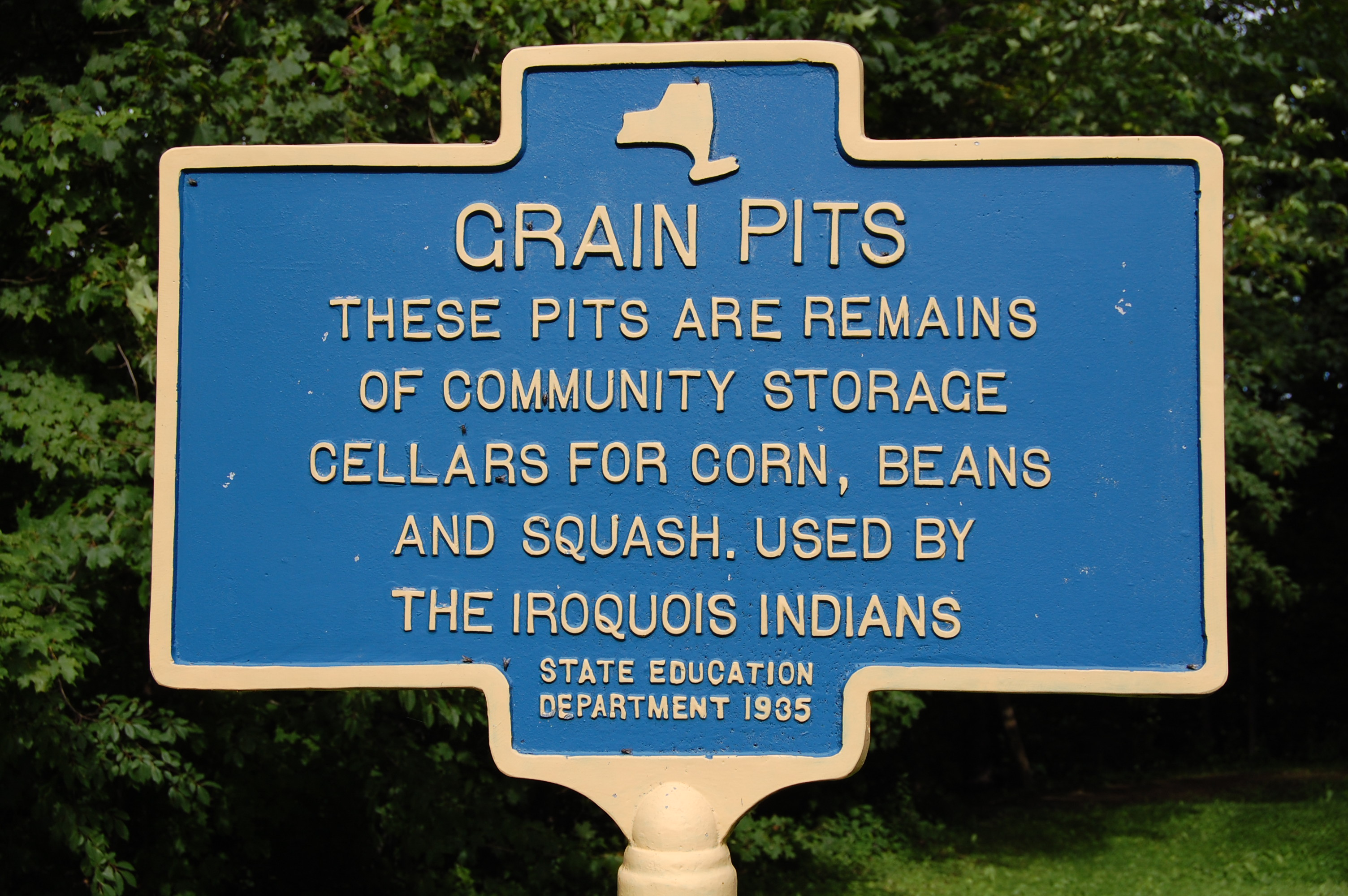
Historic marker in Madison County, New York

In the Handbook of North American Indians, the Three Sisters are called the "foundation of (Iroquois) subsistence", allowing the Haudenosaunee or Iroquois to develop the institutions of sedentary life. The Three Sisters appear prominently in Haudenosaunee oral traditions and ceremonies, such as in mythology and the Haudenosaunee Thanksgiving Address.

According to legend, the Three Sisters (Note: Mohawk: Tionhnhéhkwen ne ne áhsen nikontate’kén:’a; Onondaga: Ahsę́ Naʼdegųdęhnų́·dä·ʼ; Seneca: Jöhéhgöh) grew out of Earth Woman's dead body. During the time of creation, Sky Woman fell to Earth, where she had a daughter named Earth Woman. With the west wind, Earth Woman conceived twin sons. The first twin, Sapling, was born normally, but his evil twin brother, Flint, was so impatient that he came out of his mother's side, killing her during childbirth. As Earth Woman died, either she wished for her body to sustain the people or Sky Woman sowed on her grave the seeds she had brought when she fell to Earth, but never planted before. Out of Earth Woman's body parts grew various plants: the spirits of the corn, beans, and squash came from her breasts, hands, and navel respectively; sunflowers from her legs; strawberries from her heart; tobacco from her head; and purple potatoes or sunchokes from her feet.

It is said that in 1779, Seneca Chief Handsome Lake wished to die after the US military killed Haudenosaunee communities and villagers. Handsome Lake, grief-stricken, envisioned a visit by the spirits of the Three Sisters, prompting him to return to and re-teach his fellow Haudenosaunee their traditional agricultural practices.

Researchers in the early 20th century described more than a dozen varieties of maize and similar numbers of bean varieties, as well as many types of squash, such as pumpkin and winter squash, grown in Haudenosaunee communities. The first academic description of the Three Sisters cropping system in 1910 reported that the Iroquois preferred to plant the three crops together, since it took less time and effort than planting them individually, and because they believed the plants were "guarded by three inseparable spirits and would not thrive apart."

Among the Haudenosaunee, women were responsible for cultivation and distribution of the three crops, which raised their social status. Male roles traditionally included extended periods of travel, such as for hunting expeditions, diplomatic missions, or military raids. Men took part in the initial preparation for the planting of the Three Sisters by clearing the planting ground, after which groups of related women, working communally, performed the planting, weeding, and harvesting. Based on archaeological findings, paleobotanist John Hart concludes that the Haudenosaunee began growing the three crops as a polyculture sometime after 700 BP. The Haudenosaunee frequently traded their crops, so the need for each crop could vary substantially from year to year. Jane Mt. Pleasant surmises that the Haudenosaunee may have typically inter-planted the three crops, but they could also have planted monocultures of the individual crops to meet specific needs.

Traditional corn cultivation remains culturally important among the Haudenosaunee, and contemporary revitalization efforts include the Iroquois White Corn Project at Ganondagan State Historic Site in Victor, New York.

=== Maya culture ===
In the Maya Culture they referred to the Three Sisters of Agriculture as Milpa. The Milpa systems was used by the Maya people and many others in Mesoamerica. This agricultural practice uses the same characteristics for intercropping for maize, beans, and squash which is commonly referred to as the "Three Sisters". This traditional agriculture practice has been around and implemented for thousands of years. This practice has been used for so long because it has helped keep food security in mesoamerica and has created a long lasting cultural impact on indigenous cultures. Milpa has supported soil health, biodiversity, and is high in resources efficiency.

The Maya diet focused on the Three Sisters. Maize was the central component of the diet of the ancient Maya and figured prominently in Maya mythology and ideology. Archaeological evidence suggests that Chapalote-Nal-Tel was the dominant maize species, though it is likely others were being exploited also.

== Folklore ==
Numerous legends from indigenous cultures surround the existence and production of the Three Sister crops.

One legend personifies the crops as three human sisters. The first sister, who represents beans, is described as a toddler dressed in green. The second sister, who represents squash, is a slightly older child dressed in a yellow frock, or dress. The eldest of the three, who represents corn, is often described as wearing a pale green shawl and having long, yellow hair.

These three sisters are repeatedly visited by a young Indigenous boy, who impresses them with his character and hunting skills, specifically archery. With each visit, one of the three sisters disappears until the eldest is left alone. As such, she begins to mourn. When the Indigenous boy visits again during the season of harvest, he overhears the eldest sister's cries and brings her back to his mother and father's lodge to cheer her up. There, the eldest is reunited with her sisters who had stayed with the Indigenous boy out of curiosity. From that point onwards, the three sisters never separated again.

== Modernization of the Three Sisters ==
Over the years the Three Sisters of agriculture systems has been researched, studied, and adapted into modern agriculture. This system has been a representation of sustainable farming and allowed the system to be integrated into today's world to reap the ecological benefits of the Three Sisters.

In the recent research of the Three Sisters this system of inter-cropping can be used for many benefits in farming. The main being the improvement of soil health, a growth in crop yield, and to reduce the amount of pests in crops. The key benefit has been identified as natural pest control when growing garlic and marigolds next to vegetables. This planting can help prevent pests from getting into the crops, which reduces the amount of damage from these pests, allowing farmers to not have to rely only on chemical pesticides. The original method of the Three Sisters involves planting maize, beans, and squash together; the squash have large leaves and spiky vines that act as a form of pest deterrent.

In 2025, research found that the Three Sisters system can be modified to fit into modern mechanized agriculture. Plant spacing and placement can be adjusted to make the system better fit modern equipment constraints while keeping the benefits of inter-cropping. This allows the practice of inter-cropping to scale up to large farming operations.

== See also ==
- Agriculture in the prehistoric Southwest
- Agroforestry
- Crop rotation
- Eastern Agricultural Complex
- Inga alley cropping
- Mesoamerican agriculture
- Multiple cropping
- No-till farming
- Prehistoric agriculture on the Great Plains
- Southern New England Algonquian cuisine
