= Earthing =

Earthing may refer to:

- Ground (electricity) in electrical engineering
  - Earthing system, how to connect an electrical circuit to ground
- Energy medicine § Earthing, an alternative medicine practice
- Nature therapy, another alternative medicine practice
- Hilling, piling soil around the base of a plant
