= Jane Mount Pleasant =

American agricultural scientist

Jane Mount Pleasant (born c. 1950) is an American agricultural scientist and associate professor emerita at Cornell University.

== Early life and education ==
Mount Pleasant grew up in Syracuse, New York. Her mother was of European descent, and her father, a factory foreman, was Tuscarora. She briefly studied political science at American University in Washington, D.C., before dropping out and finding work in New York City as a taxi driver and union shop steward. She eventually obtained a master's degree from Cornell University and in 1987 earned a Ph.D. in soil science from North Carolina State University.

== Career ==
Mount Pleasant joined the faculty at Cornell in 1987, where she taught horticulture and directed the university's American Indian studies program. Her research focuses on Indigenous techniques for growing corn (maize). Specifically, she has studied the Three Sisters method of growing corn, beans, and squash together to enhance productivity and soil fertility.

== Publications ==
Her most cited publications in indigenous agriculture are:

- Scott TW, Mt. Pleasant J, Burt RF, Otis DJ. Contributions of ground cover, dry matter, and nitrogen from intercrops and cover crops in a corn polyculture system 1. Agronomy Journal 1987 Sep;79(5):792-8. Cited 178 times, according to Google Scholar.
- Pleasant JM, Burt RF. Estimating productivity of traditional Iroquoian cropping systems from field experiments and historical literature. Journal of Ethnobiology. 2010 Mar;30(1):52-79.Cited 22 times, according to Google Scholar.
- Mt. Pleasant J. Food yields and nutrient analyses of the Three Sisters: A Haudenosaunee cropping system. Ethnobiology Letters. 2016 Jan 1;7(1):87-98. Cited 15 times, according to Google Scholar.
- Mt. Pleasant J, McCollum RE, Coble HD. Weed population dynamics and weed control in the Peruvian Amazon. Agronomy Journal. 1990 Jan;82(1):102-12. Cited 16 times, according to Google Scholar.
- Mt. Pleasant JA. A new paradigm for Pre-Columbian agriculture in North America. Early American Studies. 2015 Apr 1:374-412. Cited 11 times, according to Google Scholar.

Her most cited publications in other agricultural topics are:

- Pleasant JM, Schlather KJ. Incidence of weed seed in cow (Bos sp.) manure and its importance as a weed source for cropland. Weed technology. 1994 Jun;8(2):304-10. Cited 120 times, according to Google Scholar.
- Ford GT, Pleasant JM. Competitive abilities of six corn (Zea mays L.) hybrids with four weed control practices. Weed Technology. 1994 Mar;8(1):124-8. Cited 98 times, according to Google Scholar.
- Pleasant JM, Burt RF, Frisch JC. Integrating mechanical and chemical weed management in corn (Zea mays). Weed Technology. 1994 Jun;8(2):217-23.Cited 55 times, according to Google Scholar.
