= Hoe (tool) =

Agricultural tool

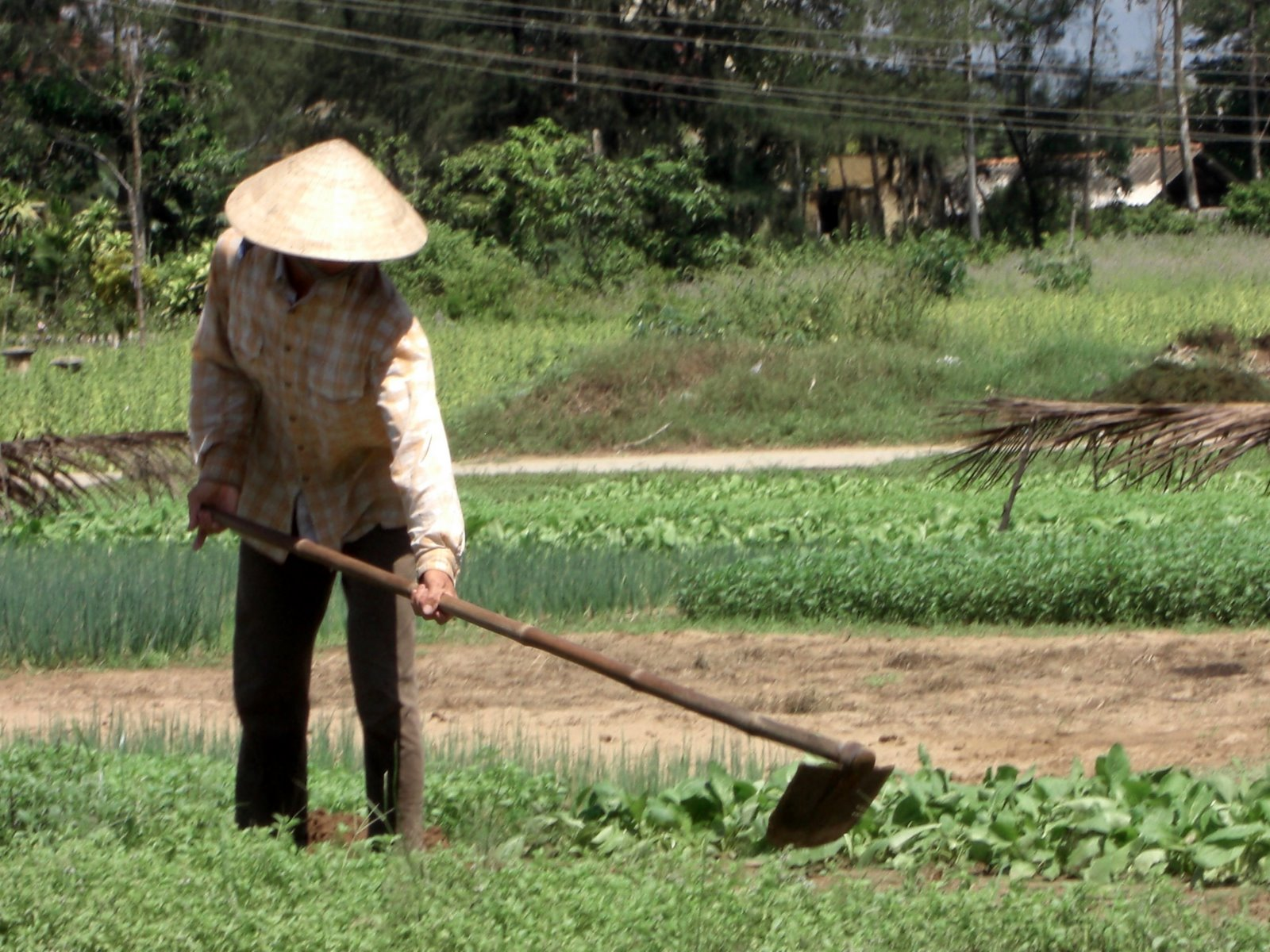
A farmer using a hoe to keep weeds down in a vegetable garden.

A hoe is an ancient and versatile agricultural and horticultural hand tool used to shape soil, remove weeds, clear soil, and harvest root crops. Shaping the soil includes piling soil around the base of plants (hilling), digging narrow furrows (drills) and shallow trenches for planting seeds or bulbs. Weeding with a hoe includes agitating the surface of the soil or cutting foliage from roots, and clearing the soil of old roots and crop residues. Hoes for digging and moving soil are used to harvest root crops such as potatoes.

== Types ==
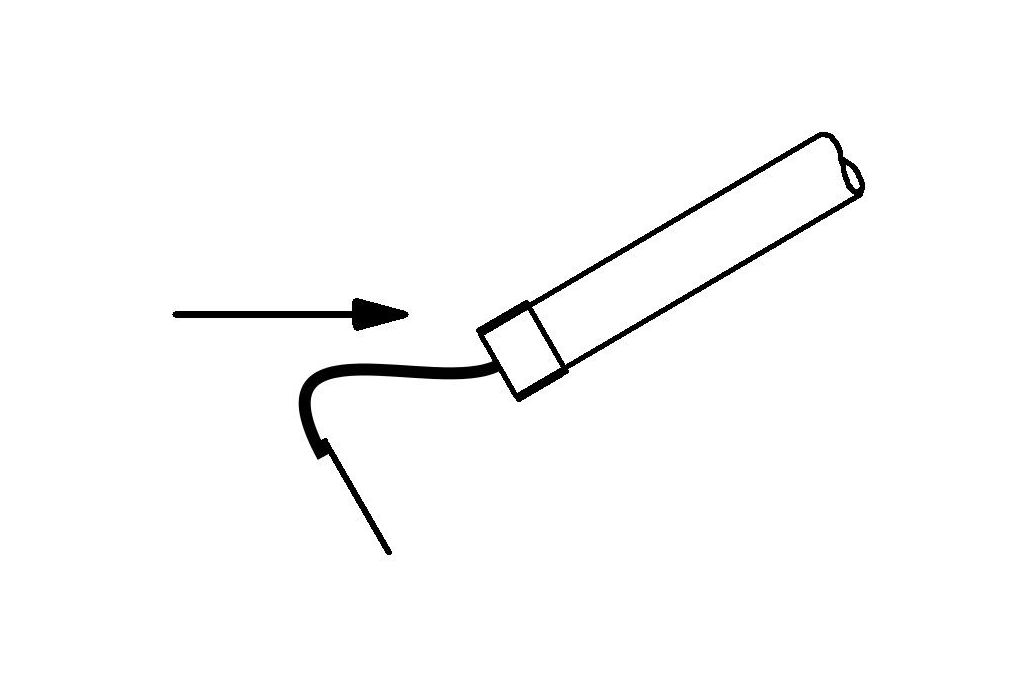
Cultivating tool, a pull or draw hoe

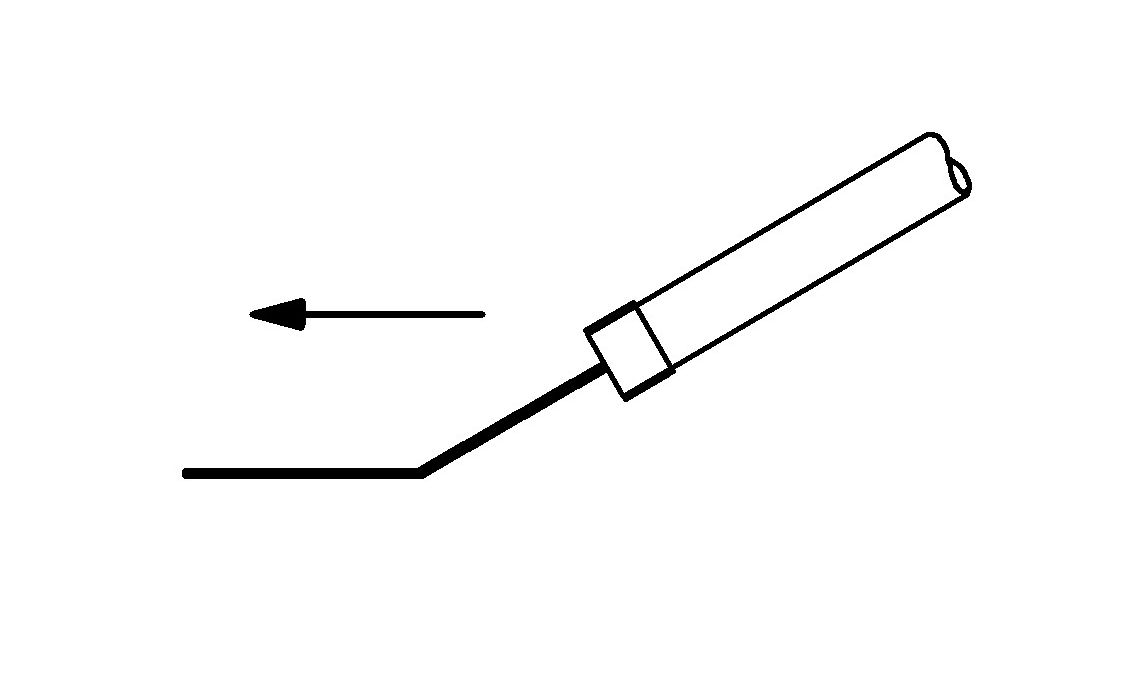
Cultivating tool, a push or thrust hoe

There are many kinds of hoes of varied appearances and purposes. Some offer multiple functions, while others have only a singular and specific purpose.

There are two general types of hoe: draw hoes for shaping soil, and scuffle hoes for weeding and aerating soil.

A draw hoe has a blade set at approximately a right angle to the shaft. The user chops into the ground and then pulls (draws) the blade towards them. Altering the angle of the handle can cause the hoe to dig deeper or more shallowly as the hoe is pulled. A draw hoe can easily be used to cultivate soil to a depth of several centimetres. A typical design of draw hoe, the "eye hoe", has a ring in the head through which the handle is fitted. This design has been used since Roman times.

A scuffle hoe is used to scrape the surface of the soil, loosen the top few centimetres, and to cut the roots of, remove, and disrupt the growth of weeds efficiently. These are primarily of two different designs: the Dutch hoe and the hoop hoe.

A hand hoe is usually a light-weight, short-handled hoe of any type, although it may be used simply to contrast hand-held tools against animal- or machine-pulled tools.

=== Draw hoes ===
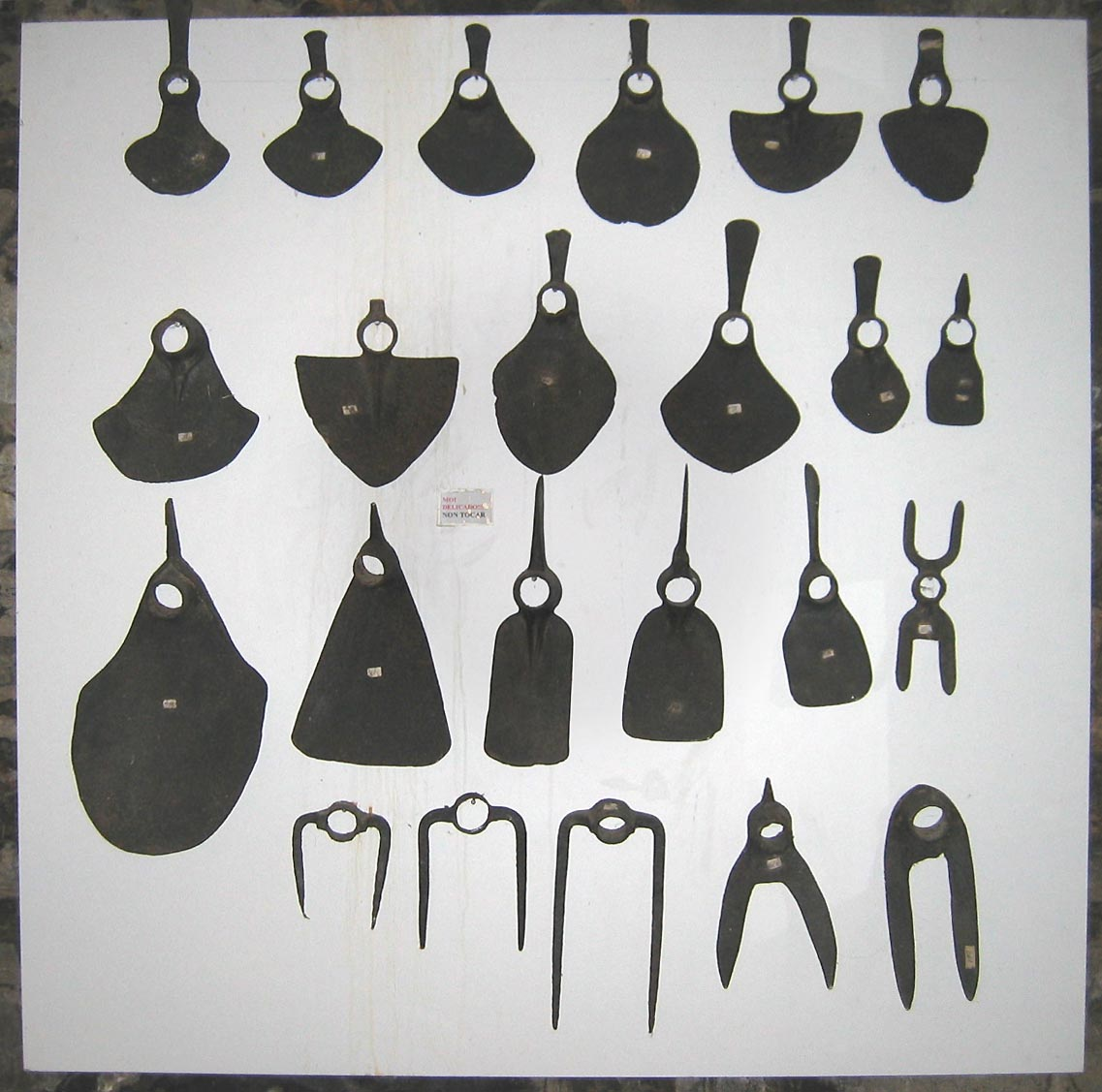
Eye hoe heads, some with sow-tooth (German: Sauzahn), Centro Etnográfico de Soutelo de Montes, Pontevedra, Spain

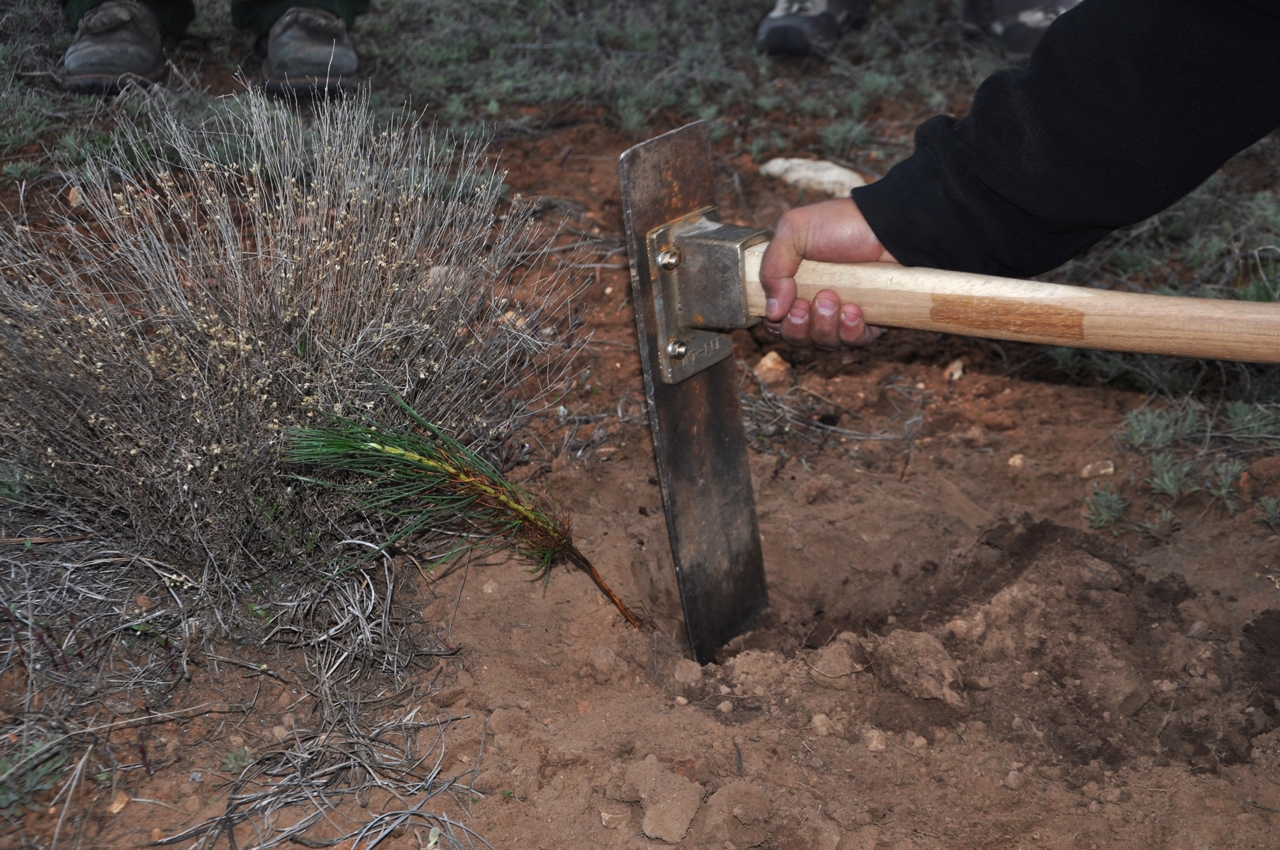
Hoedad (tree-planting tool) Kaibab National Forest, Arizona, USA

- The typical farming and gardening hoe with a heavy, broad blade and a straight edge is known as the Italian hoe, grub hoe, grubbing hoe, azada (from Spanish), grab hoe, pattern hoe or dago hoe ("dago" being an ethnic slur referring to Italians, Spaniards, or Portuguese).
- The ridging hoe, also known as the Warren hoe and the drill hoe, is a triangular (point-down) or heart-shaped draw hoe that is particularly useful for digging narrow furrows ("drills") and shallow trenches for the planting of seeds or bulbs.
- The Paxton hoe is similar to the Italian hoe, but with a more rounded rectangular blade.
- The flower hoe has a very small blade, rendering it useful for light weeding and aerating around growing plants, so as not to disturb their shallow roots while removing weeds beyond the reach of the gardener's arm.
- The hoedad, hoedag or hodag is a hoe-like tool used to plant trees. According to Hartzell (1987, p. 29), "The hoedag [was] originally called skindvic hoe... Hans Rasmussen, legendary contractor and timber farm owner, is credited with having invented the curved, convex, round-nosed hoedag blade which is widely used today" (emphasis added).
- The mortar hoe is a tool specific to the manual mixing of mortar and concrete, and has the appearance of a typical square-bladed draw hoe with the addition of large holes in the blade.

=== Scuffle hoes ===
- The Dutch hoe is designed to be pushed or pulled through the soil to cut the roots of weeds just under the surface. A Dutch hoe has a blade "sharp on every side so as to cut either forward and backward". The blade must be set in a plane slightly upwardly inclined in relation to the dual axis of the shaft. The user pushes the handle to move the blade forward, forcing it below the surface of the soil and maintaining it at a shallow depth by altering the angle of the handle while pushing. A scuffle hoe can easily cultivate the soil and remove weeds from the surface layer.
- The hoop hoe, also known as the action hoe, oscillating hoe, hula hoe, stirrup hoe, scuffle hoe, loop hoe, pendulum weeder, or swivel hoe) has a double-edge blade that bends around to form a rectangle attached to the shaft. Weeds are cut just below the surface of the soil as the blade is pushed and pulled. The back and forth motion is highly effective at cutting weeds in loose or friable soil. The width of the blade typically ranges between 8 and 18 cm (3 and 7 in). The head is a loop of flat, sharpened strap metal. However, it is not as efficient as a draw hoe for moving soil.
- The collinear hoe or collineal hoe has a narrow, razor-sharp blade which is used to slice the roots of weeds by skimming it just under the surface of the soil with a sweeping motion; it is unsuitable for tasks like soil moving and chopping. It was designed by Eliot Coleman in the late 1980s.
- The swoe hoe is a modern, one-sided cutting hoe, being a variant of the Dutch hoe.

=== Other hoes ===
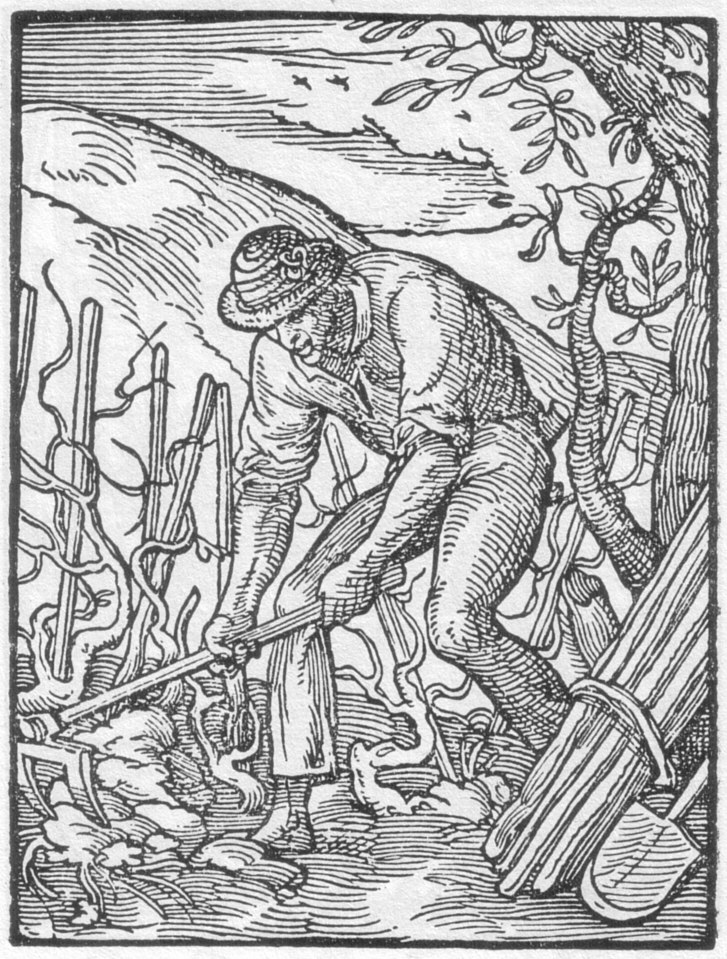
Fork-hoe depiction in Der Rebmann (the vine-dresser). Jost Amman, Das Ständebuch, 1568

Hoes resembling neither draw nor scuffle hoes include:

- Wheel hoes are, as the name suggests, a hoe or pair of hoes attached to one or more wheels. The hoes are frequently interchangeable with other tools. The historic manufacturer of the wheel hoe was Planet JR, these wheel hoes are still produced by Hoss Tools.

- Horse hoes, resembling small ploughs, were a favourite implement of agricultural pioneer Jethro Tull, who claimed in his book "Horse Hoeing Husbandry" that "the horse-hoe will, in wide intervals, give wheat throughout all the stages of its life, as much nourishment as the discreet hoer pleases." The modern view is that, rather than nutrients being released, the crop simply benefits from the removal of competing plants. The introduction of the horse hoe, together with the better-known seed drill, brought about the great increase farming productivity seen during the British Agricultural Revolution.
- Fork hoes (also known as prong hoes, tined hoes, Canterbury hoes, drag forks or bent forks) are hoes that have two or more tines at right angles to the shaft. Their use is typically to loosen the soil, prior to planting or sowing.
- Clam hoes, made for clam digging
- Adze hoes, with the basic hoe shape but heavier and stronger and with traditional uses in trail making.
- Pacul or cangkul (hoes similar to adze hoe from Malaysia and Indonesia)
- Gang hoes for powered use (in use at least from 1887 to 1964).
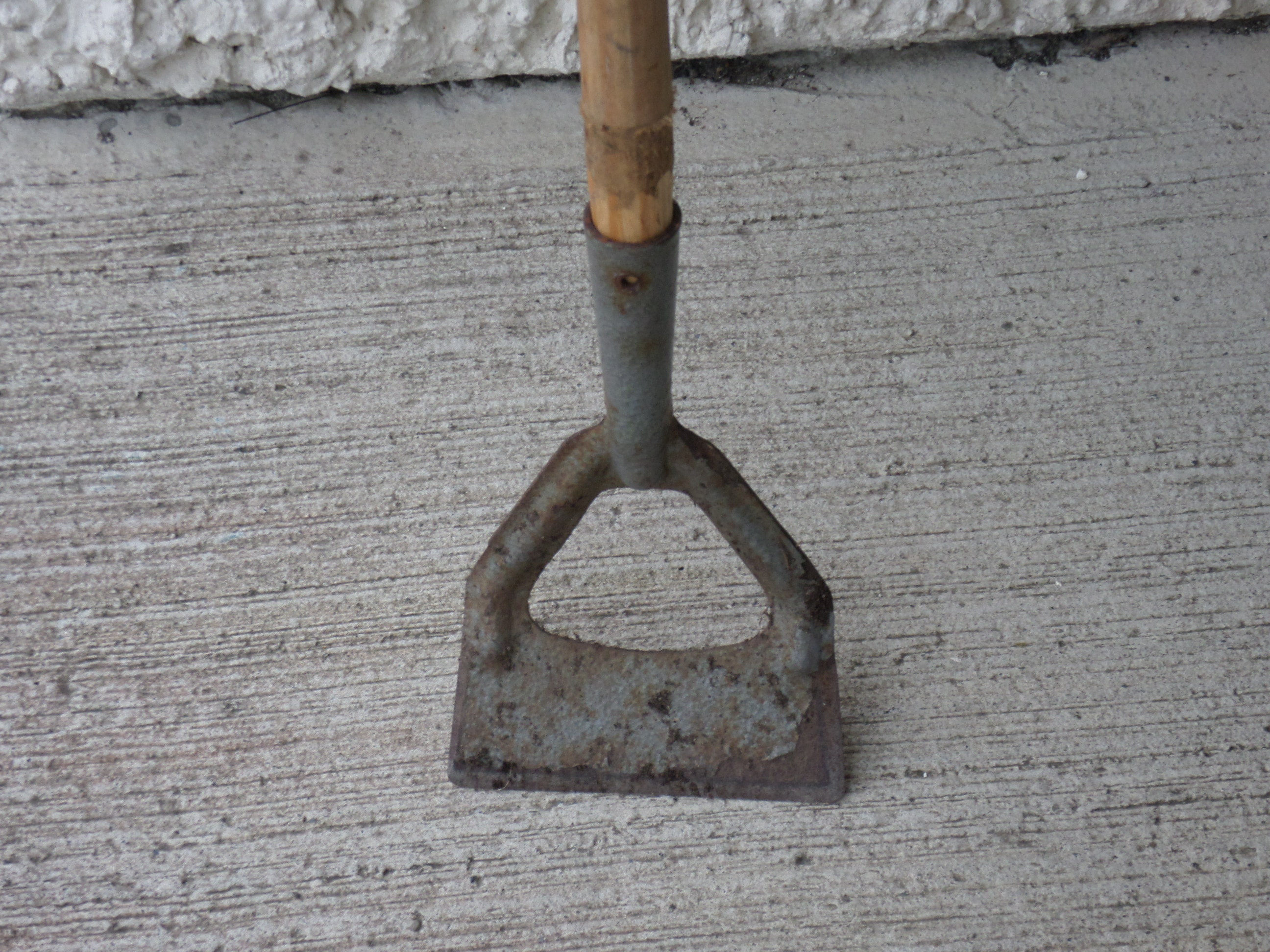
An old Dutch hoe

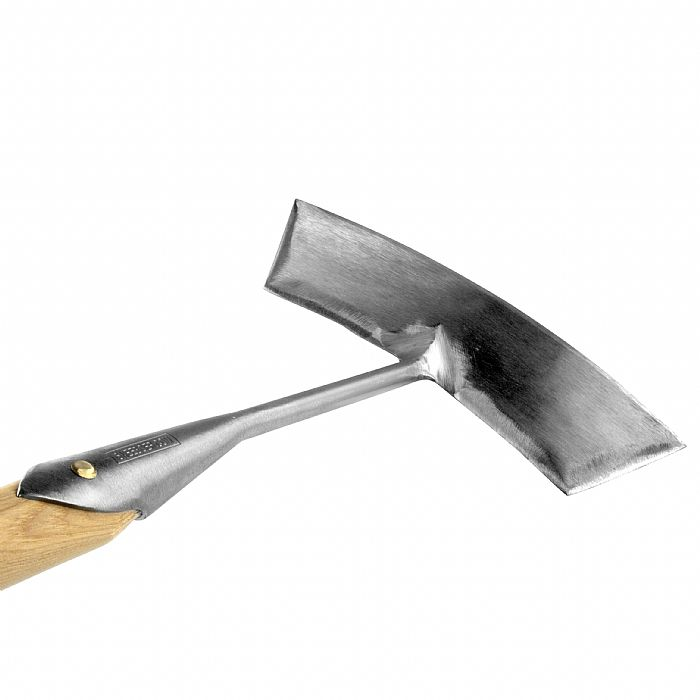
A push hoe

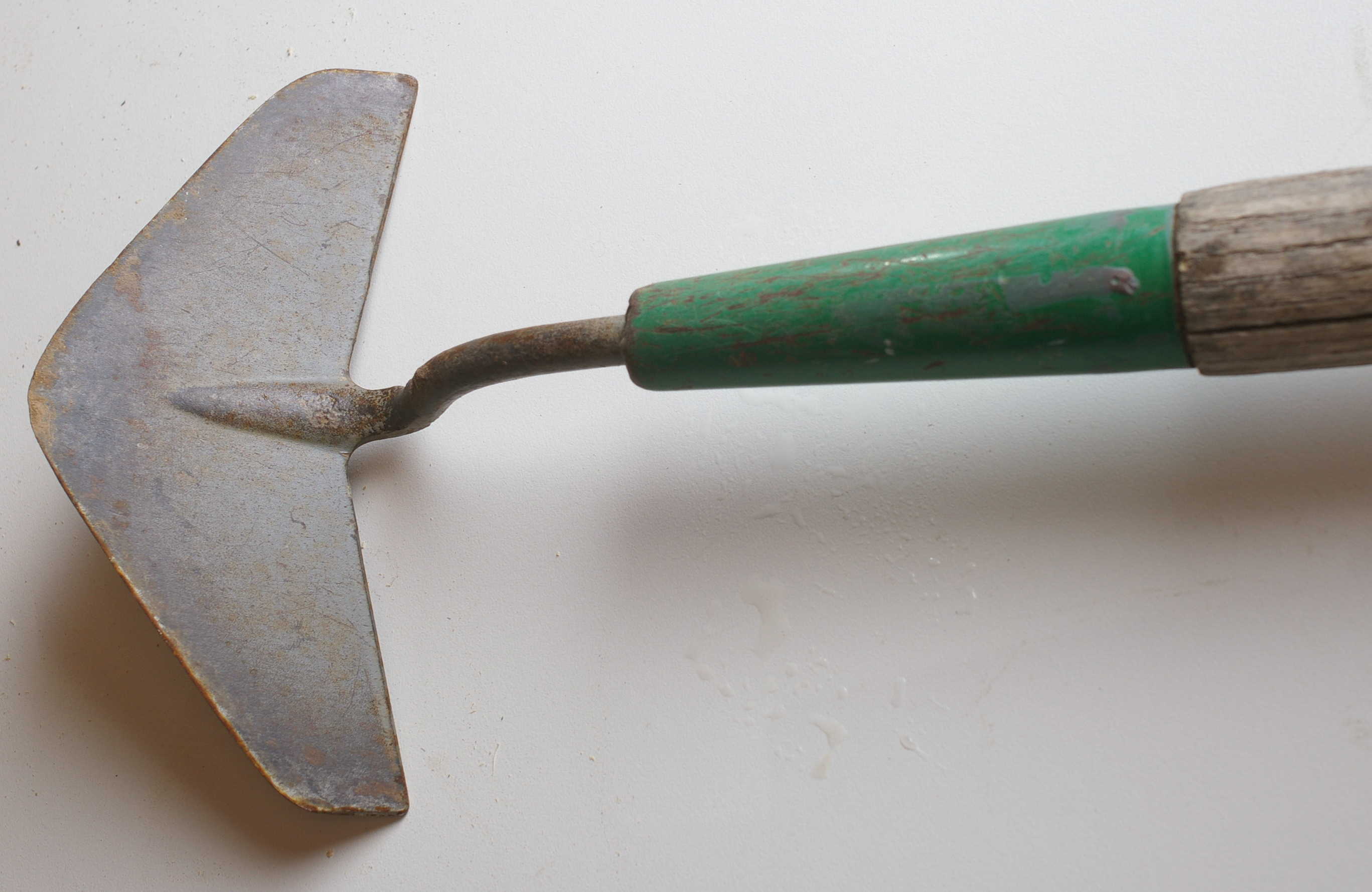
A Dutch hoe or push hoe; usually attached to a long hilt and handle

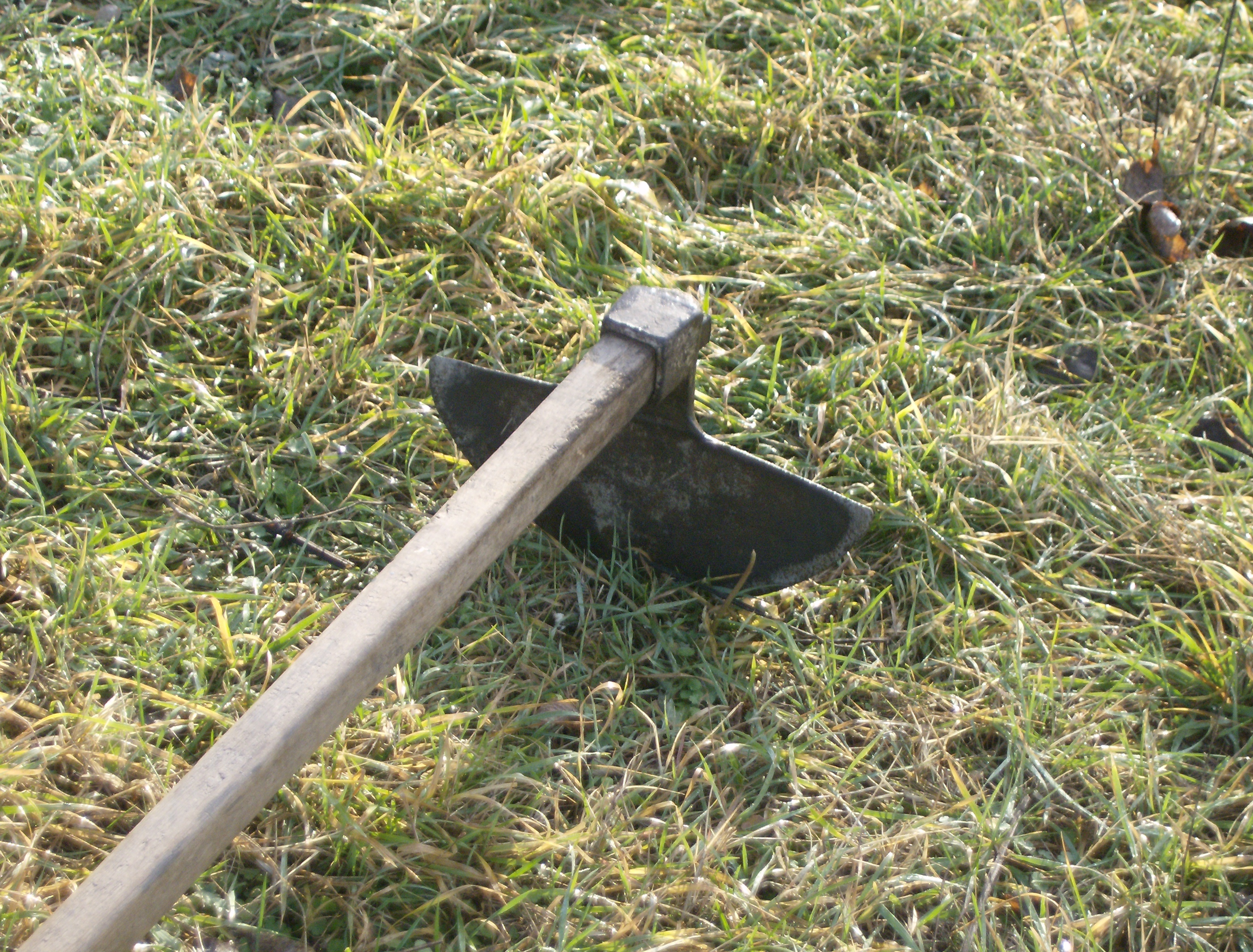
Curved blade

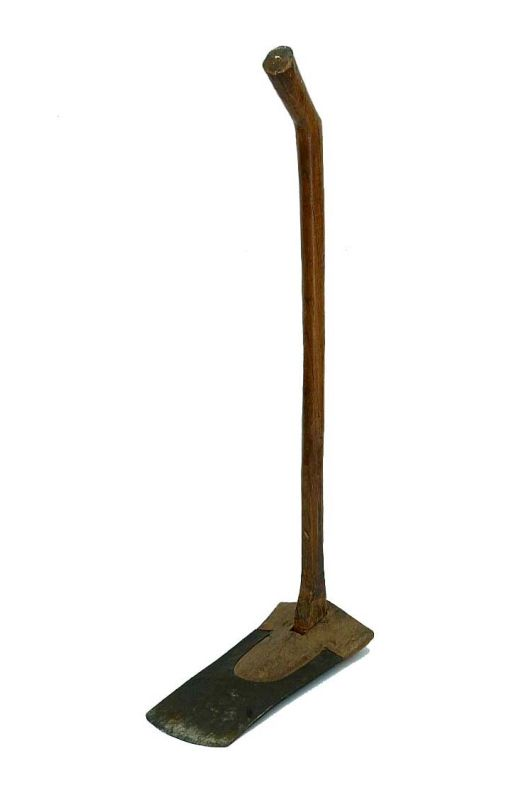
Indonesian Pacul

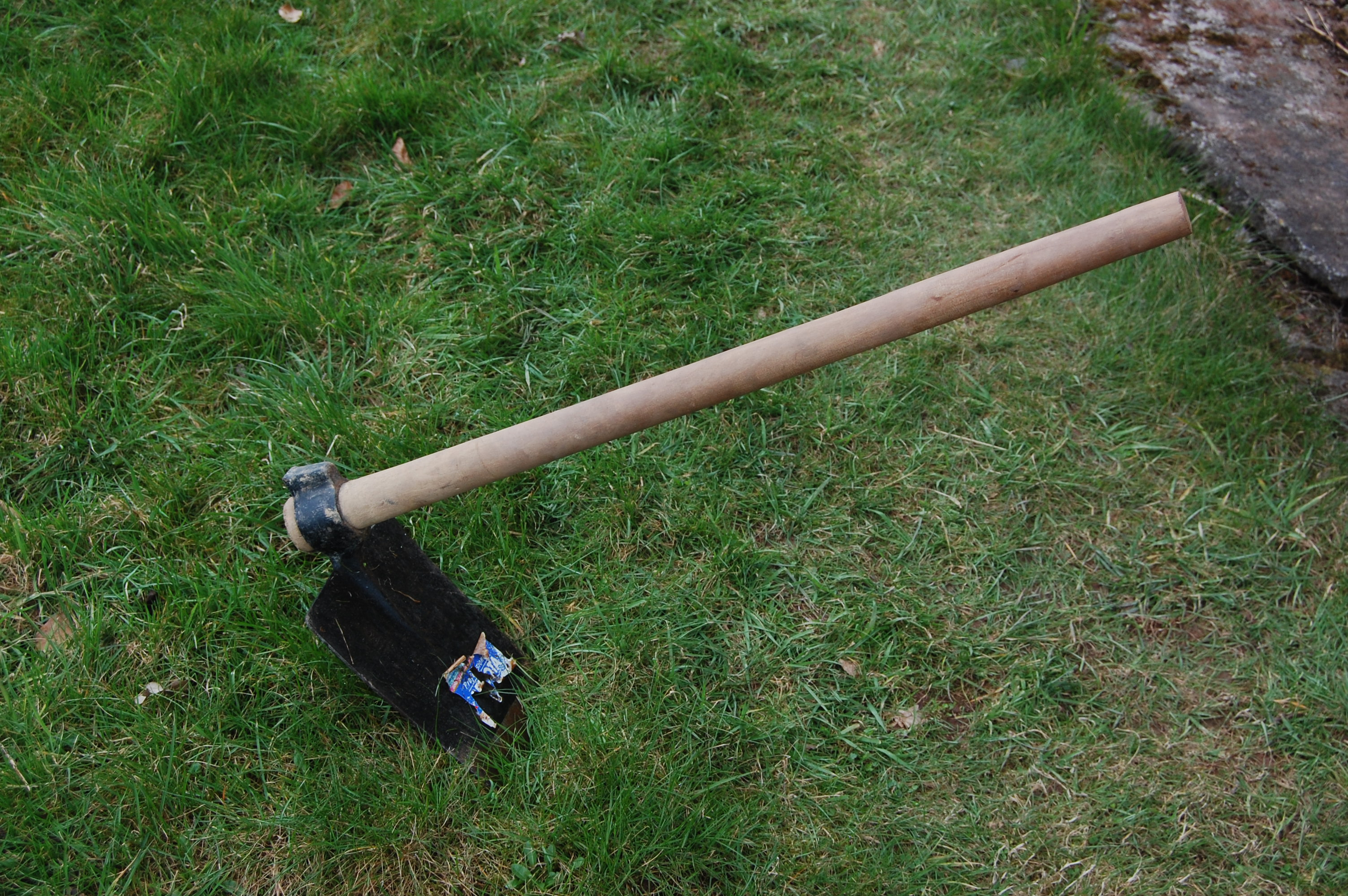
Short-handled grub hoe

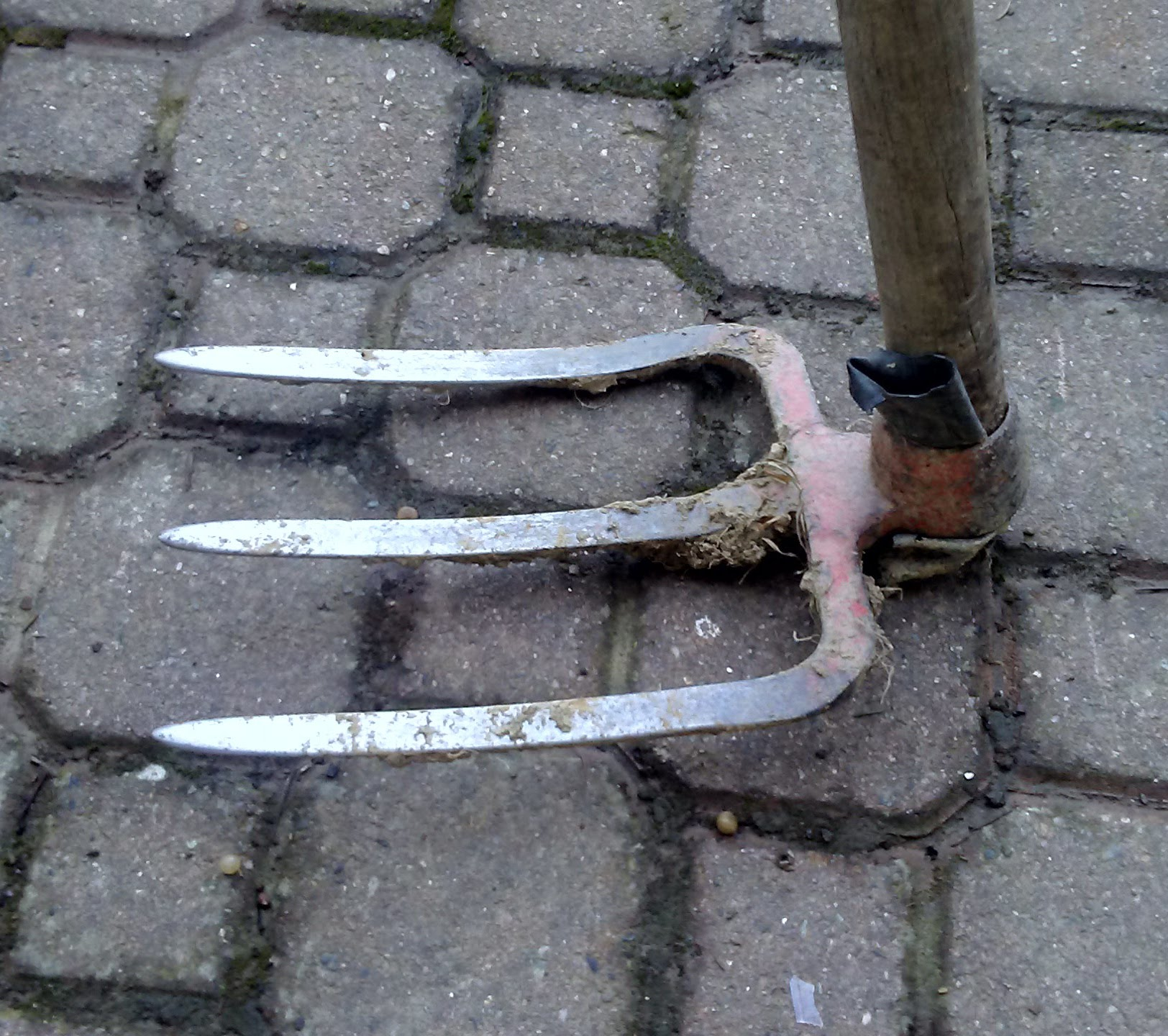
Fork hoe

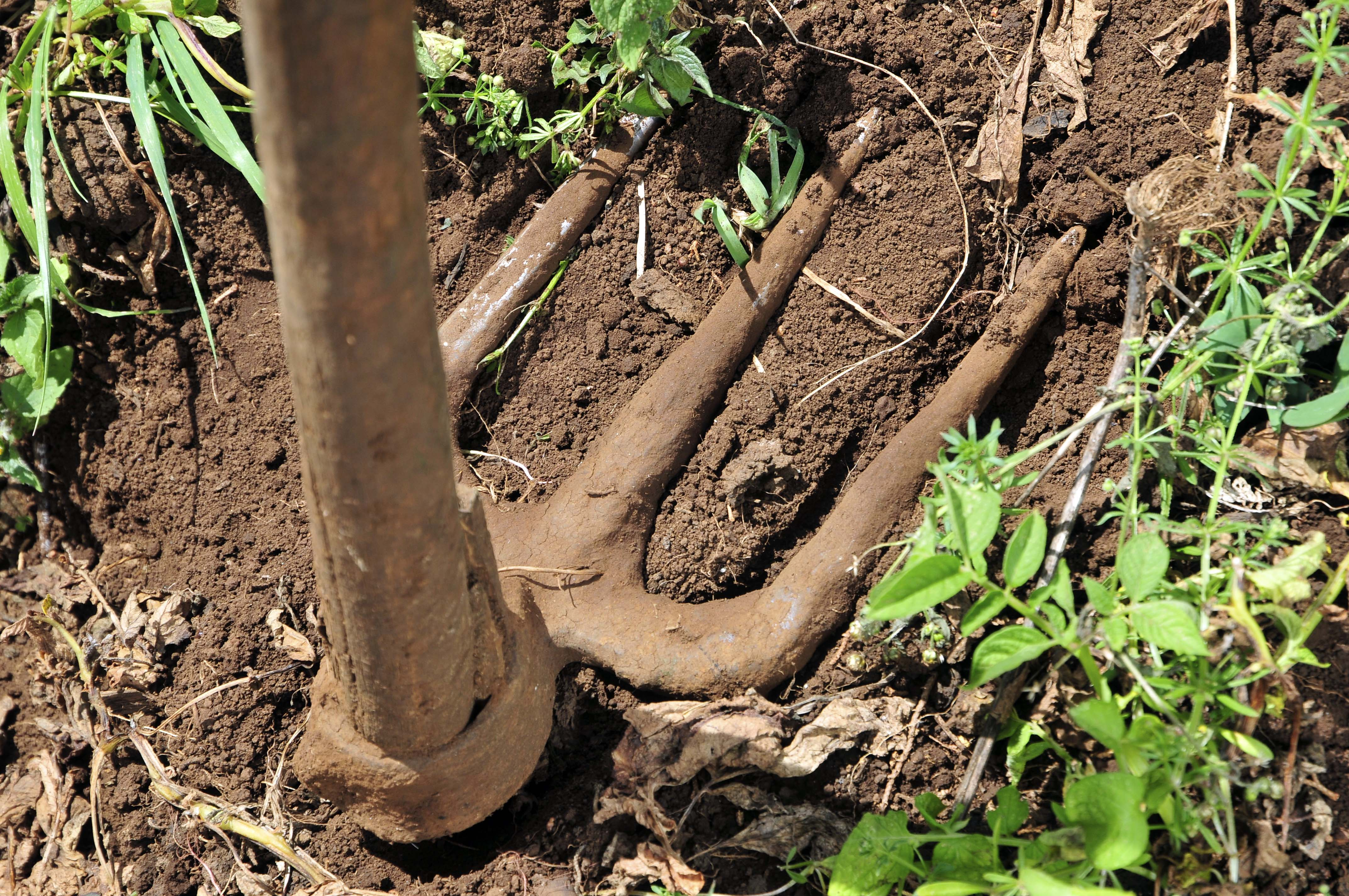
A three-tined hoe from Mount Kenya.

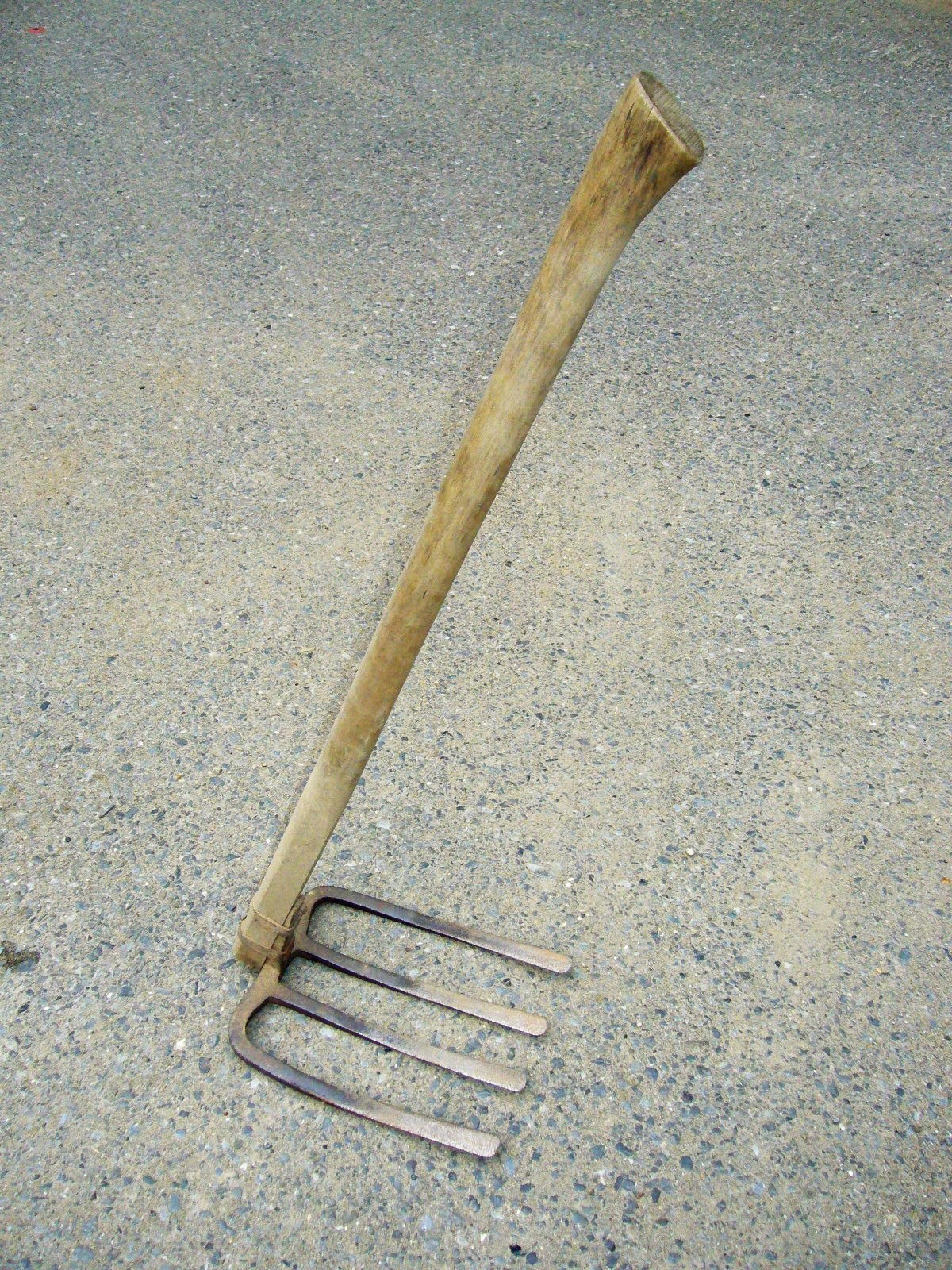
Japanese 'bicchiu-guwa' (びっちゅうぐわ), a fork-hoe for paddy fields.

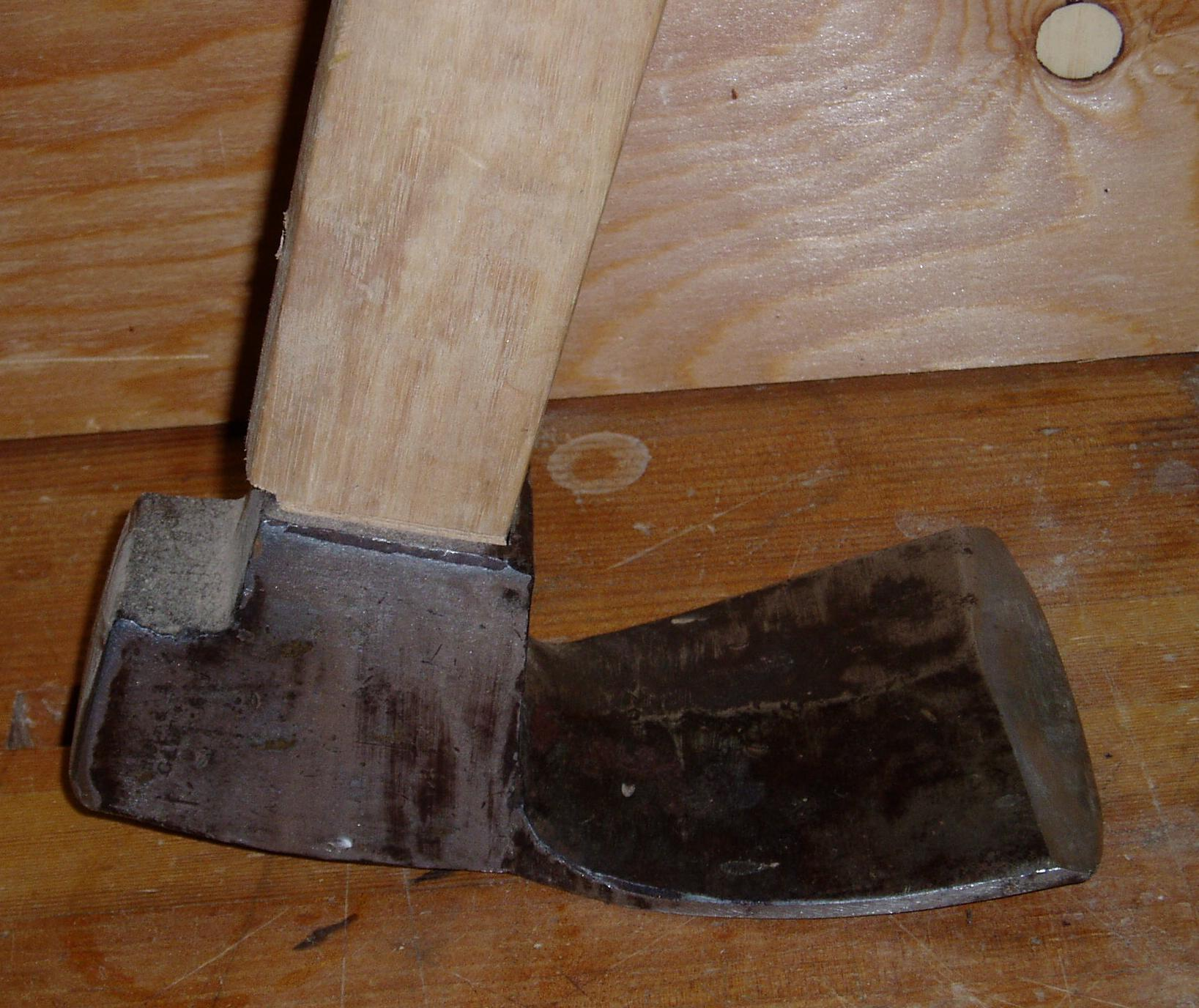
Blade of an adze

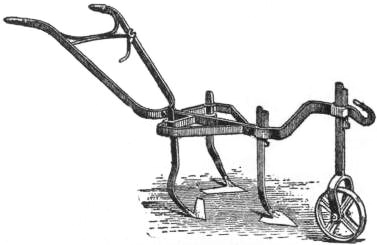
Horse hoe

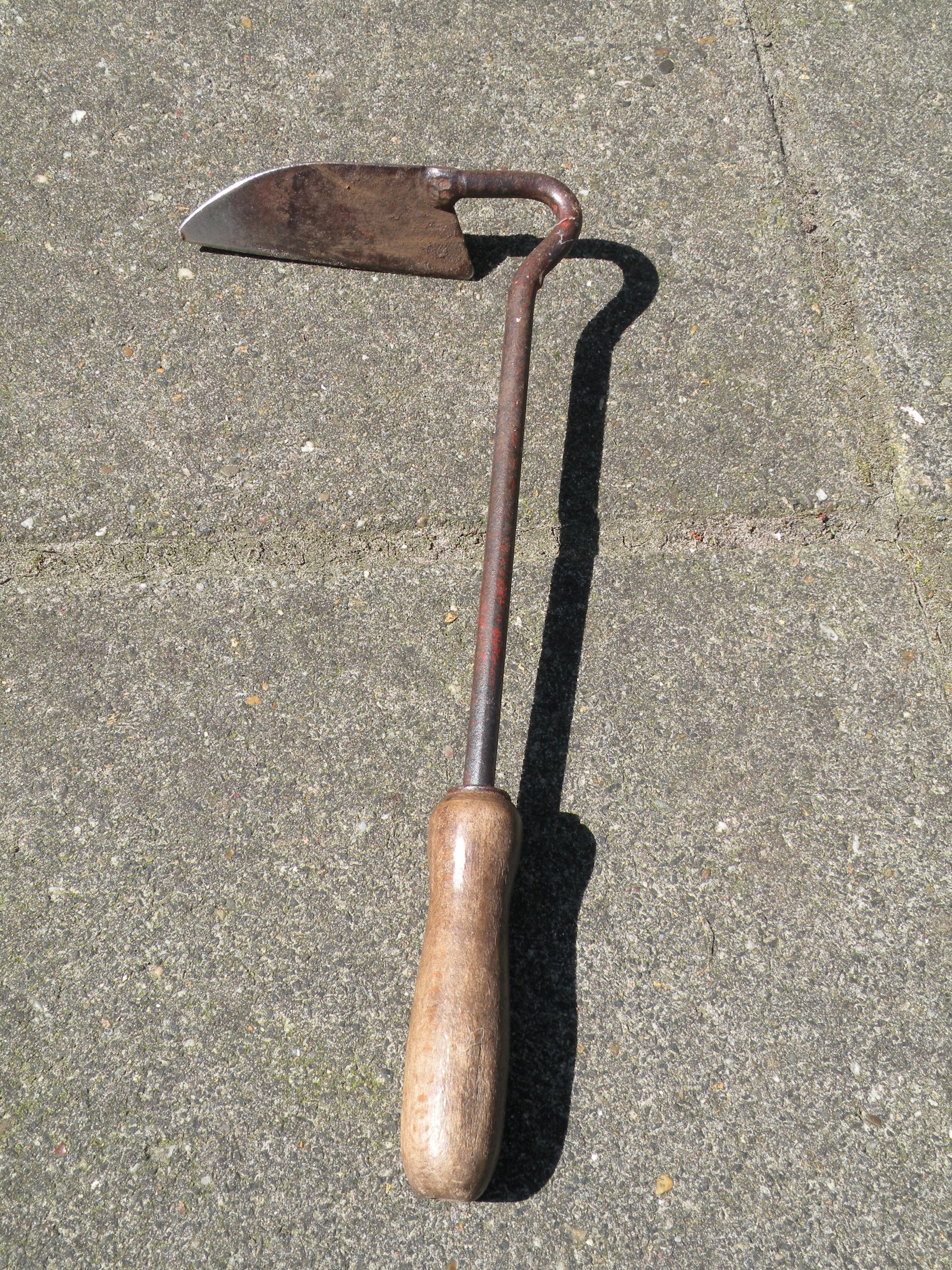
A hand hoe, i.e. a small, short-handled hoe

== History ==
Hoes are an ancient technology, predating the plough and perhaps preceded only by the digging stick. In Sumerian mythology, the invention of the hoe was credited to Enlil, the chief of the council of gods. The hoe features in a Sumerian disputation poem known as the Debate between the hoe and the plough, dating to the 3rd millennium BC, where a personified hoe debates a personified plough over which tool is the better. At the end of the poem, the hoe is declared the winner. Another composition from the same era and language, the Song of the hoe, is dedicated to the praise of this tool.

The hand-plough (mr) was depicted in predynastic Egyptian art, and hoes are also mentioned in ancient documents like the Code of Hammurabi (ca. 18th century BC) and the Book of Isaiah (c. 8th century BC).

Long-term use of short-handled hoes, which required the user to bend over from the waist to reach the ground, could cause permanent, crippling lower back pain to farm workers. Over time, this resulted in change after a struggle led by César Chávez with the political help of Governor Jerry Brown in the California Supreme Court. They declared that the short-handled hoe was an unsafe hand tool, which was then banned under California law in 1975.

'Mr' hand-plough, Protodynastic Period of Egypt (from the Scorpion Macehead)

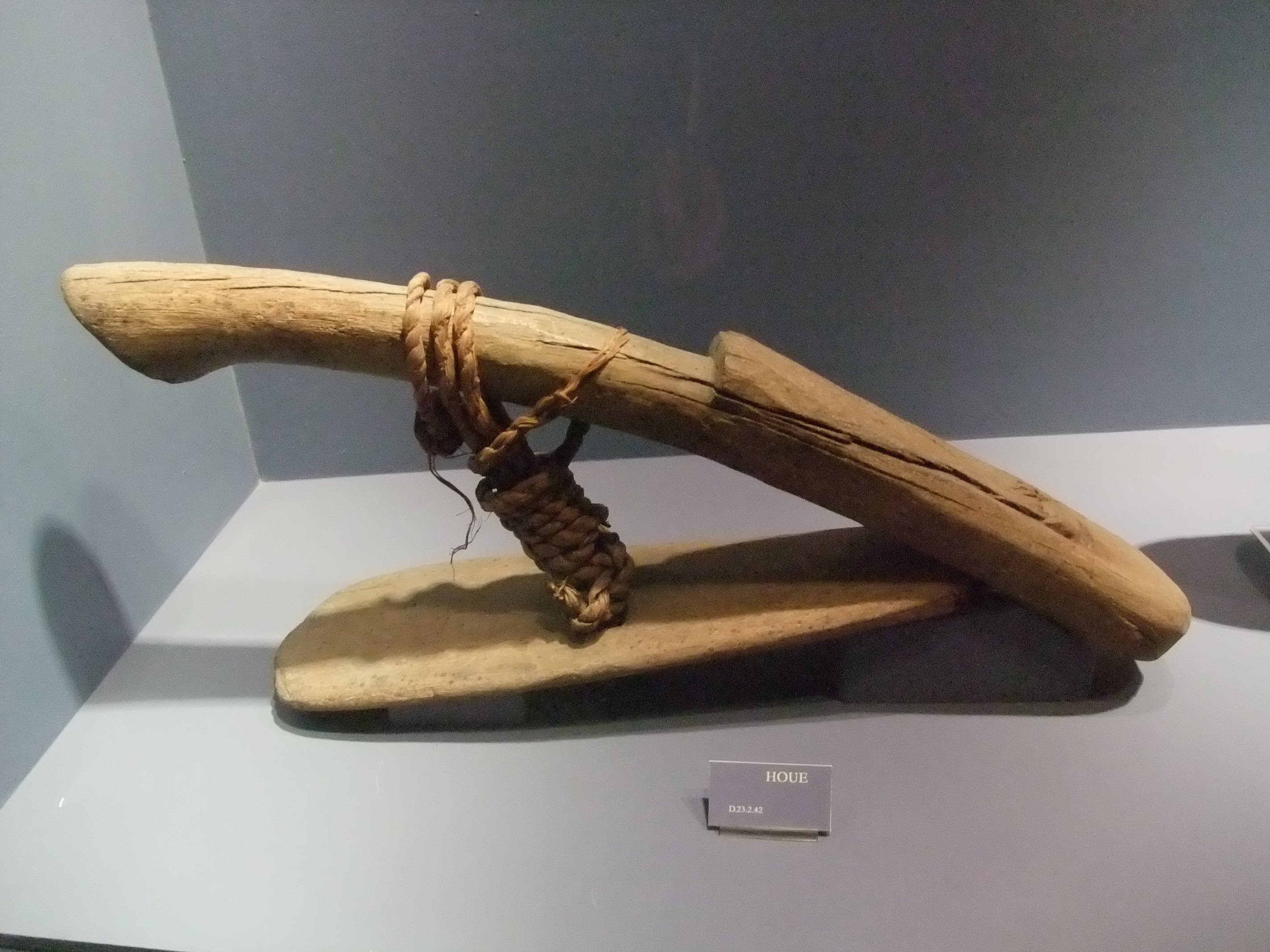
An ancient Egyptian hoe

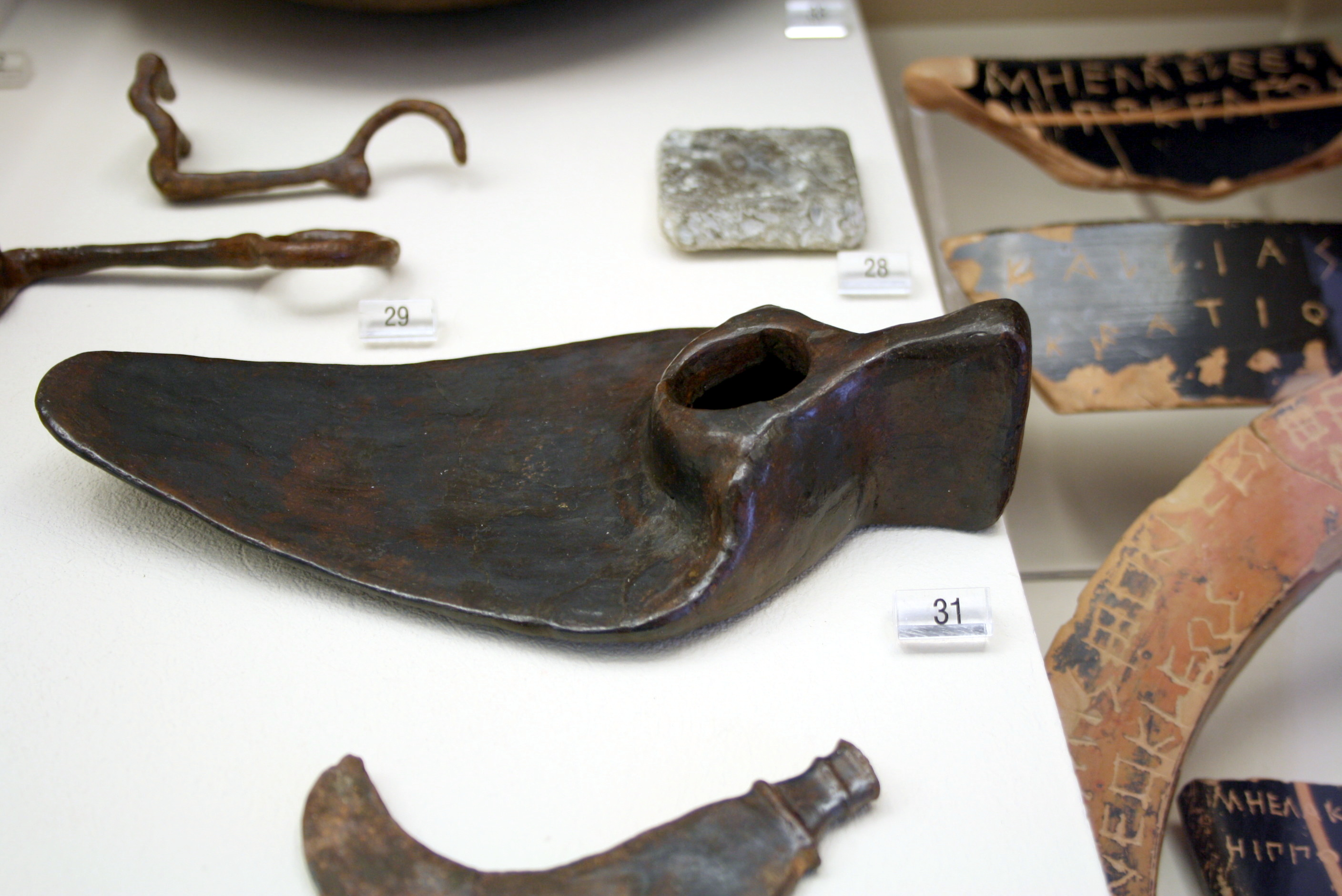
Ancient Greek iron hoe (Kerameikos Archaeological Museum)

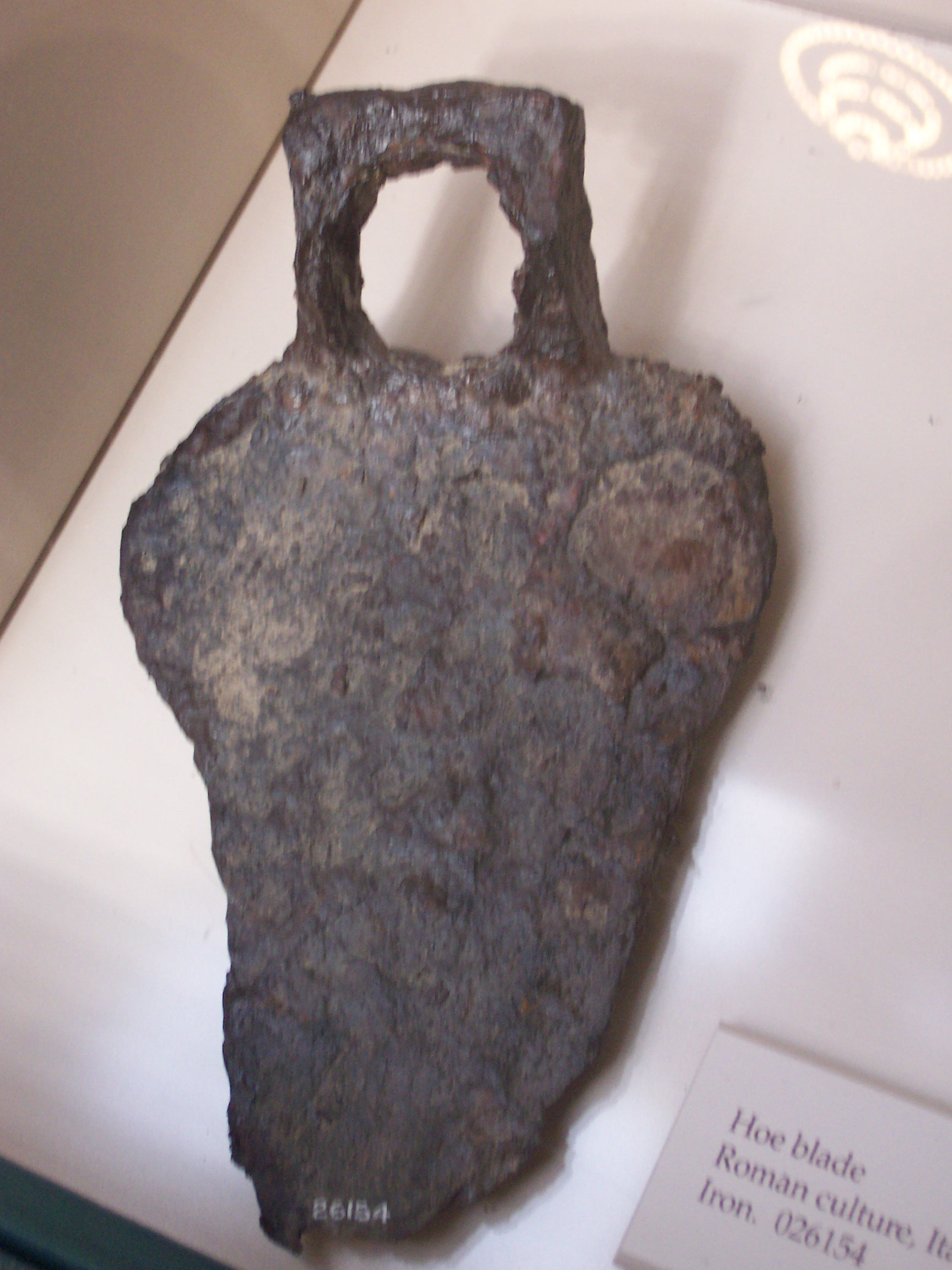
A 2000-year-old iron Roman hoe blade

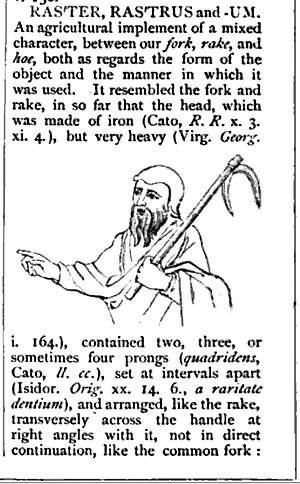
Roman fork-hoe, called a "Raster"

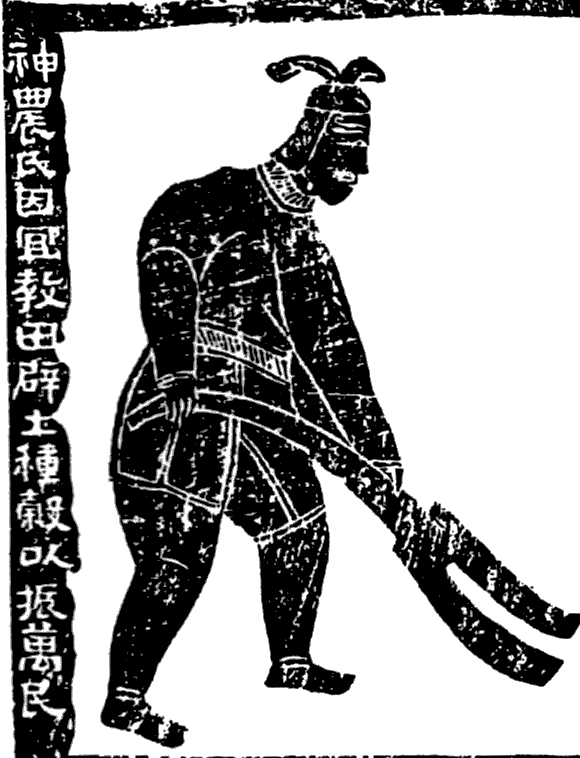
Shennong the Divine Farmer (Han dynasty, 2nd century)

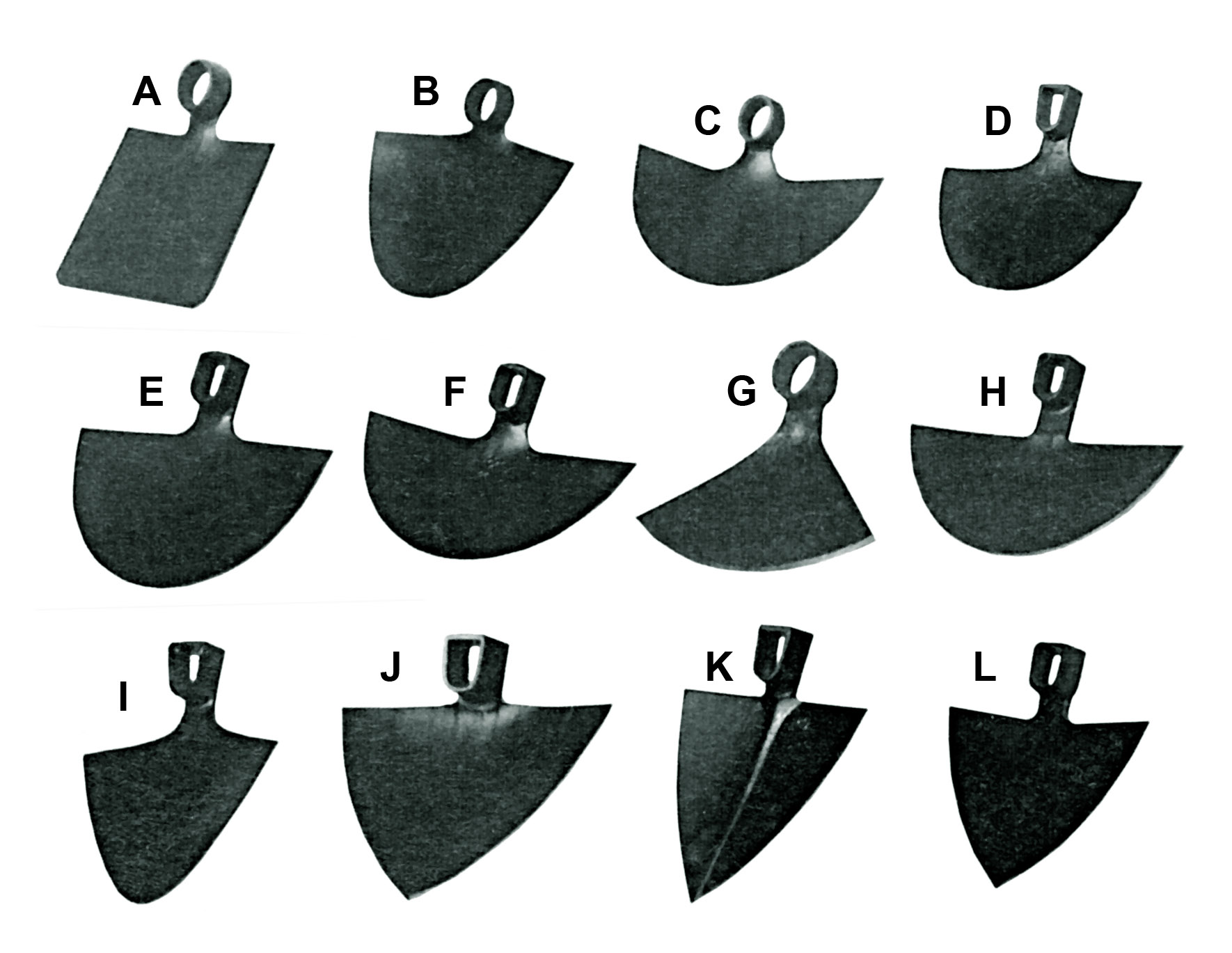
Draw hoe blades from Serbia

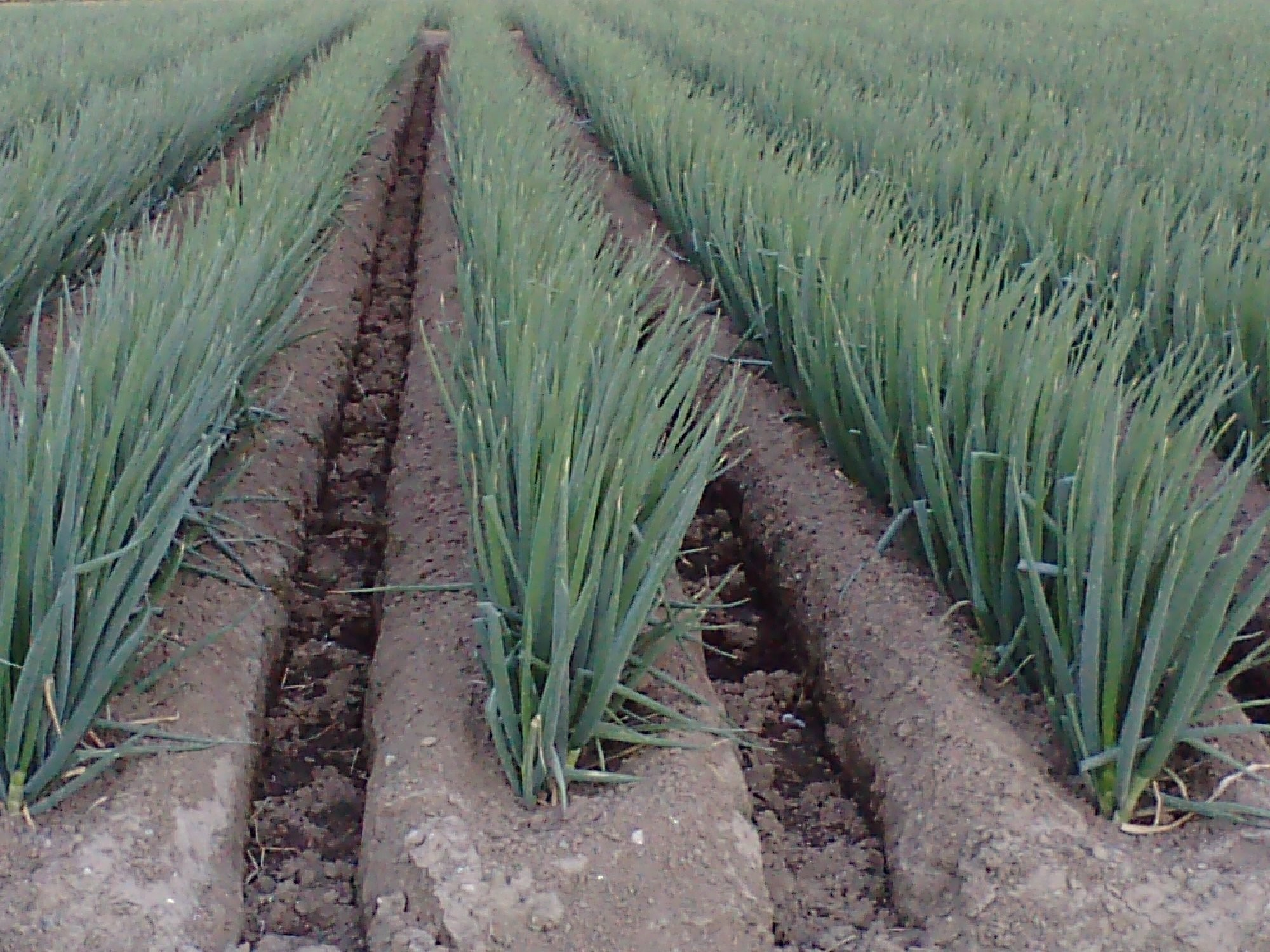
Hilling Japanese Une (畝) for scallions, ploughed by rotary tiller or hoe (2007)

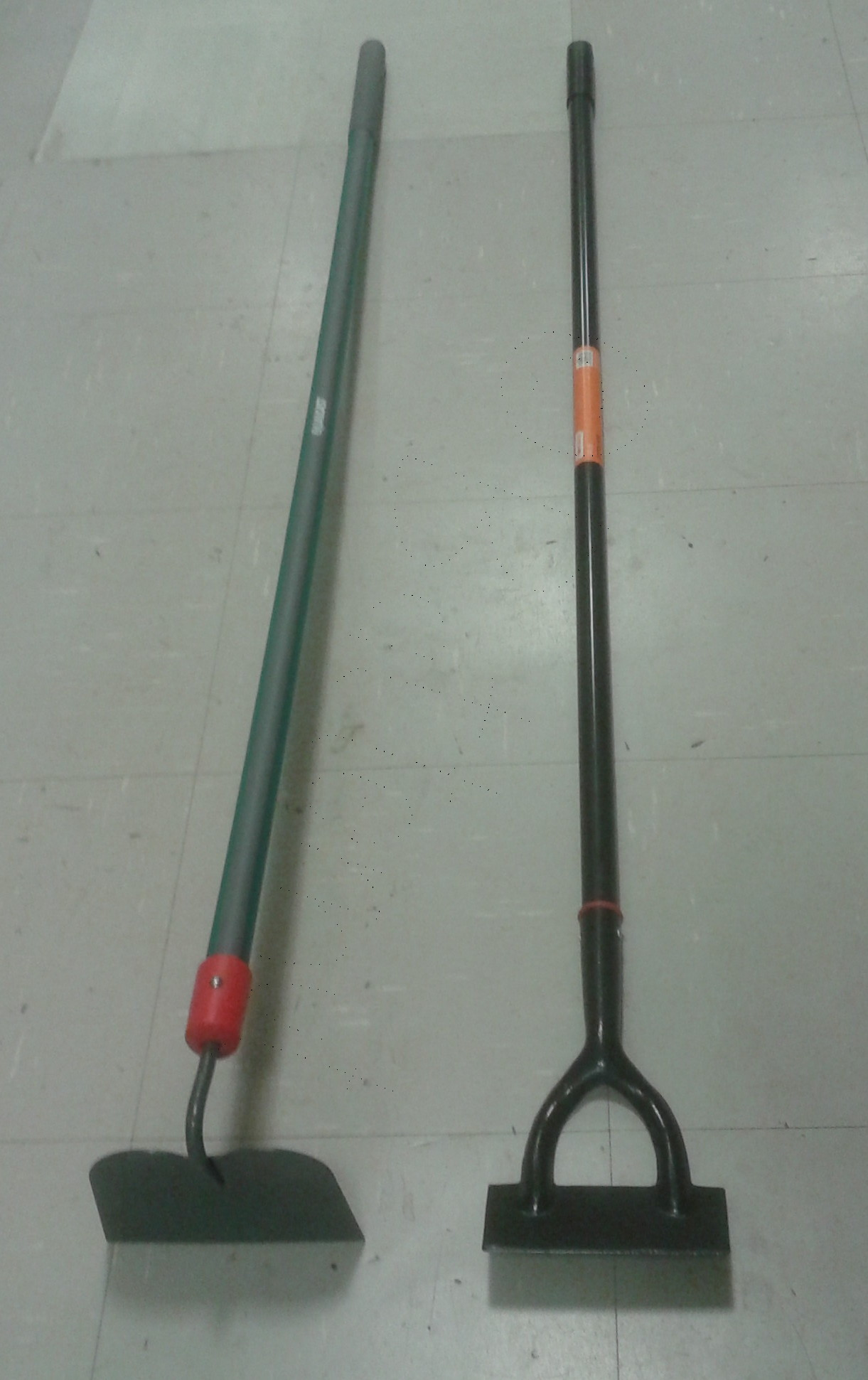
Draw hoe (left) and Dutch hoe (right) sold now in the UK.

Flag of Mozambique, featuring a draw hoe

== Archaeological use ==
Over the past fifteen or twenty years, hoes have become increasingly popular tools for professional archaeologists. While not as accurate as the traditional trowel, the hoe is an ideal tool for cleaning relatively large open areas of archaeological interest. It is faster to use than a trowel, and produces a much cleaner surface than an excavator bucket or shovel-scrape, and consequently on many open-area excavations the once-common line of kneeling archaeologists trowelling backwards has been replaced with a line of stooping archaeologists with hoes.

== See also ==
- Adze
- Backhoe
- Hoe-farming
- Hoedads Reforestation Cooperative
- Homi
- Mattock
- Pitchfork
- Rake (tool)
- Rotary hoe (aka rotary tiller or cultivator)
- Tree planting bar
- Weeder
