= Hoe-farming =

Primitive agriculture without use of the plow

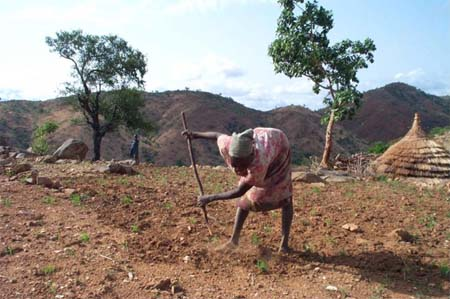
Use of the digging stick for tillage in the Nuba Mountains, Southern Sudan (2001 photograph)

Hoe-farming is a primitive form of agriculture defined by the absence of the plough. Tillage in hoe-farming cultures is done by simple manual tools such as digging sticks or hoes. Hoe-farming is the earliest form of agriculture practiced in the Neolithic Revolution. Early forms of the plough (ard) were introduced throughout the Near East (Naqada II) and Europe (Linear Pottery culture) by the 5th to 4th millennium BC. The invention spread throughout Greater Persia and parts of Central Asia, reaching East Asia in the 2nd millennium BC (Chinese Bronze Age).

The term hoe-farming was introduced (as German: Hackbau, as opposed to Ackerbau) by Eduard Hahn in 1910.

The parts of the world where agriculture was introduced but not the plough (in the case of the New World up to the introduction of plough-farming with European colonization) were named the hoe-cultivation belt (Hackbaugürtel) by Hahn (1914), followed by Werth (1954). The hoe-cultivation belt is mostly located in tropical latitudes, including Sub-Saharan Africa (but not the Horn of Africa, where the plough appears to have been introduced via Egypt), Maritime Southeast Asia, and the pre-Columbian Americas.

Hoe-farming often coincides with long fallow systems and shifting cultivation. Split hoes (also known as prong hoes, tined hoes or bent forks) are hoes that have two or more tines at right angles to the shaft. Their use is typically to loosen the soil, prior to planting or sowing. It provides the ability to cultivate effectively at small row distances. Split hoeing is contrasted to permanent plough-based cultivation systems and the intensification of agriculture. Hoe-farming may contain slash and burn clearance techniques, but they are not strictly necessary. It is usually embedded in the logic of subsistence agriculture.

== See also ==
- Subsistence agriculture
- Center of origin
- Plough § History
