= Hilling =

Heaping of soil around the base zone of a crop

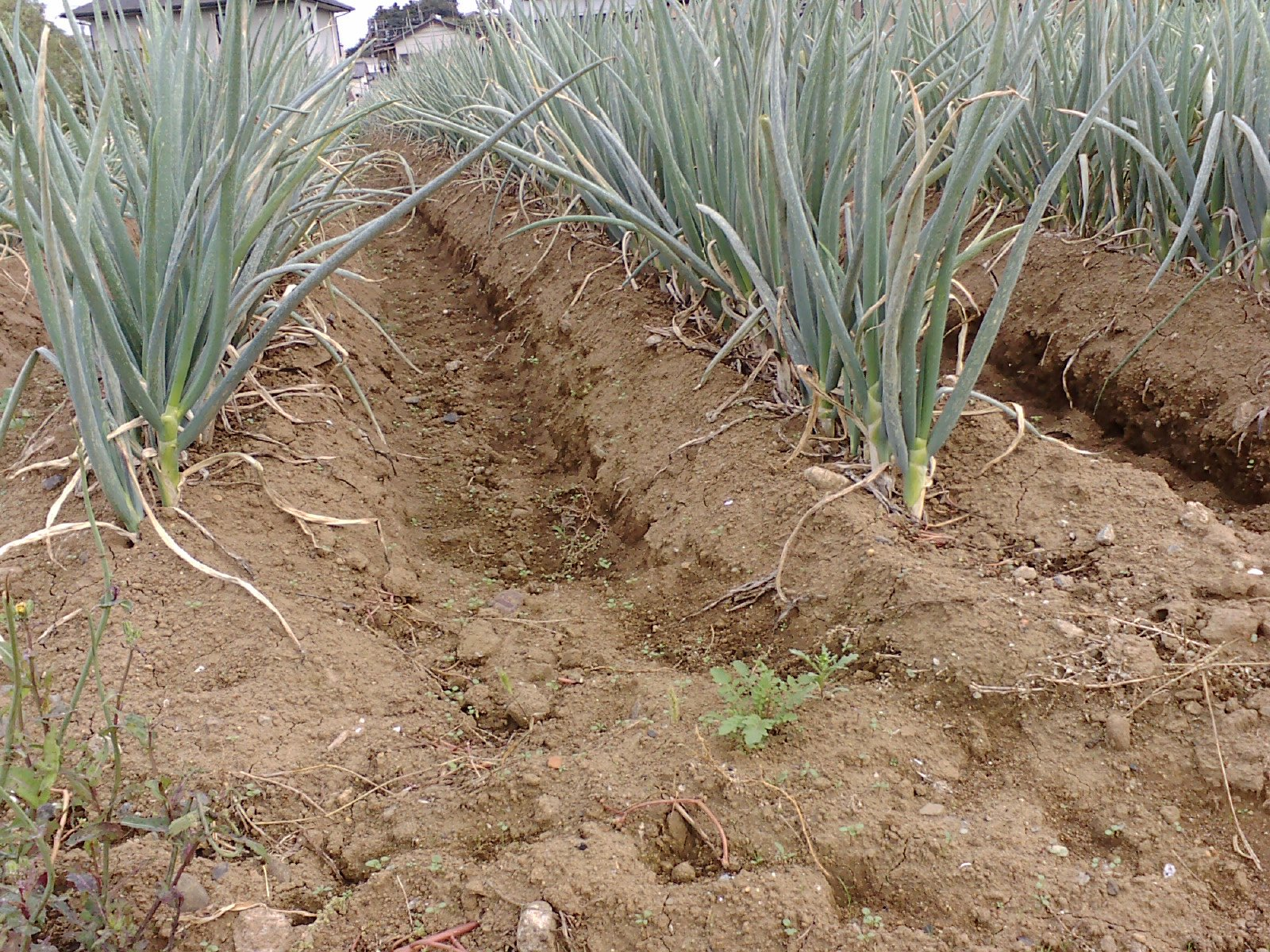
Hilling (Japanese Une 畝) ploughed by a hoe for scallions to increase crop yields.

Hilling, earthing up or ridging is the technique in agriculture and horticulture of heaping soil up around the base of a plant. It can be done by hand (usually using a hoe), or with powered machinery, typically a tractor attachment.

Hilling buries the normally above-ground part of the plant, promoting desired growth. This may encourage the development of additional tubers (as with potatoes), force the plant to grow longer stems (leeks), or for some crops (chicory, leeks, asparagus etc.) this blanching technique keeps the stems or shoots pale and tender, or influences their taste.

Hilling helps to smother weeds. It may also be used to stabilize the stems of crops which are easily disturbed by wind.

== Examples ==
A common application of hilling is for potatoes. The tubers grow just below the surface, and can produce chlorophyll and solanine if exposed to light (green potatoes). Solanine is toxic in large doses, and can result in nausea, headache, and in rare cases, death. By hilling one or more times during the growing season – effectively, burying the potatoes in an additional few inches of soil – yield is improved, and the harvest remains edible.

In vineyards, at the beginning of the winter period, hilling:

- reduces the risk of damage by frost. Indeed, a heat gradient is formed by the thermal inertia of the earth. It is warmer inside the mound of soil.
- facilitates the flow of water (which presence is important because of precipitation during winter). The evacuation can be done via grooves.
- destroys weeds.
