= Jigonhsasee =

Cofounder of the Haudenosaunee Confederacy

- Mohawk: Tsiokonsaseh; Onondaga: Jigųhsáhsęʼ; Seneca: Jigö́hsahsë
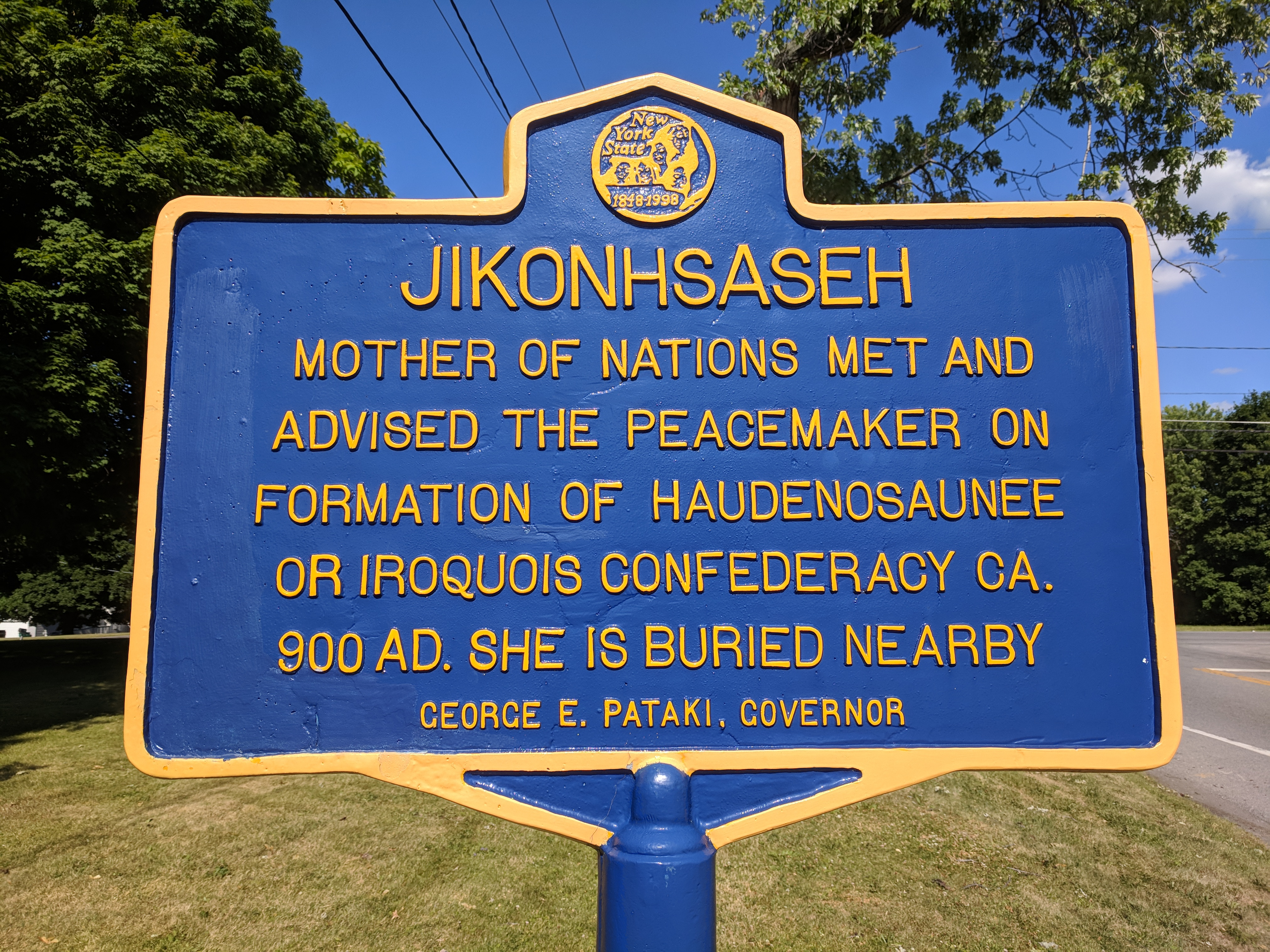
- Jikonhsaseh Historic Marker near Ganondagan State Historic Site
- Born: 12th century Wendake or Onoñ·dáʼgeh
- Died: 12th century Haudenosauneega
- Known for: Cofounder of the Haudenosaunee Confederacy

Jigonhsasee (Note: Mohawk: Tsiokonsaseh * Onondaga: Jigųhsáhsęʼ * Seneca: Jigö́hsahsë) (alternately spelled Jikonhsaseh, Jikonsase, or Tsiokonsaseh, IPA: [dʒigũhsase]) was an Iroquoian woman considered to be a co-founder, along with the Great Peacemaker and Hiawatha, of the Haudenosaunee (Iroquois) Confederacy sometime between AD 1142 and 1450; others place it closer to 1570–1600. For her role in the founding of the Haudenosaunee League, Jigonhsasee became known as the Mother of Nations and was named the Head Clan Mother of the Haudenosaunee. The name Jigonhsasee was transferred to her successors as Head Clan Mother until the 1800s.

== Legend and oral history ==
According to a short version of the Haudenosaunee oral tradition, an Iroquoian woman lived along the warriors' path. In some accounts she was referred to as Jigonhsasee; in others, she was given that name as a new one by the Great Peacemaker after he recognized her as an ally in making peace. She was known for her hospitality to warriors as they traveled to and from battlegrounds and their homes. At her hearth, warriors of the various factions could come in peace. While they ate her food, she acted as counsel and learned their hearts. In some versions, she is described as a descendant of Sky Woman.

It is in this context that the Great Peacemaker came to her and described his vision for a peace to be built upon a confederacy of the warring nations. She said this sounded good but asked what form it would take. He replied, "It will take the form of the longhouse in which there are many hearths, one for each family, yet all live as one household under one chief mother. They shall have one mind and live under one law. Thinking will replace killing, and there shall be one commonwealth."

The woman recognized the power in peace, and she joined Hiawatha and the Peacemaker to unite the Haudenosaunee. Together, they freed the Onondaga leader Tadodaho of the evil that tormented him, naming him as the Chief of Chiefs of the Grand Council of the Haudenosaunee. At the peace gathering under the Tree of Peace, the Great Peacemaker gave Jigonhsasee the task of assigning the men to different positions within the Grand Council, and to women in the future the power to choose the chiefs of the longhouse. He called her Mother of Nations, as she was the first ally of his peace movement, and she became the head Clan Mother of the Haudenosaunee.

== Commentary ==
Jacob Needleman, a contemporary American writer on religion, notes that in Iroquoian history, "through the mediation of a woman"..., "the mission of peace takes form in the world." In addition, "it is women's power of judgement that will ultimately determine the leadership of the Iroquois Confederacy." because the Great Peacemaker gave women the power to choose the chiefs who would represent their people at council. According to oral tradition, the Great Peacemaker, who brought Hiawatha and this woman together to create the Haudenosaunee Confederacy, gave her a new name of Jigonhsaseh, saying that it meant New Face: "It is in your countenance that a New Mind is manifest." Needleman writes further that "Out of the womb of the New Mind the nations will be born anew."

According to John Brown Childs, an American sociologist of Oneida, Massachusaug, and African-American ancestry, Jigonhsaseh means "she who lives on the road to war", as this important woman lived next to the warriors' path that ran from east to west.

Some scholars have suggested that the constitution of the Haudenosaunee Confederacy influenced colonists who drafted the U.S. Constitution, and while there is no academic consensus on this, the United States Senate passed a resolution in 1988 acknowledging the Iroquois Confederacy of Nations' influence.

== Legacy and honors ==
The name Jigonhsasee continued to be passed to the leading Clan Mother of the Haudenosaunee from the founding of the Confederacy until the 1800s, mainly through Seneca or Wendat women of the Wolf Clan. The last Jigonhsasee was Caroline Parker, brother of Seneca Hoyaneh Ely S. Parker; due to the dispersal of the Haudenosaunee, no successor has been named since.

Genetic researchers in the late 20th century named one of the five human mitochondrial DNA haplogroups (in the maternal line) found among Native American populations as Djigonasee in her honor.

== See also ==
- List of peace activists
