= Haudenosaunee music =

Haudenosaunee music and dance are central components of traditional social gatherings of the Haudenosaunee, which take place in longhouses.

These gatherings are led by an individual who finds lead dancers and singers and introduces them to the audience, also providing dancing instructions. Instruments used include rattles, drums, flutes, and other percussive instruments. The music is always religious music.

The religious function of the dances have evolved to deemphasize war dances, in favor of dances focused on curing ailments, commemorating the dead, and controlling the weather. Socials within all Haudenosaunee communities are meant to be enjoyed by all in attendance, especially when everyone dances.

== Songs ==
Social songs vary in length, verses and tempo depending on the song selection of the singers. All dances are done in a counter clockwise direction.

A social is run by a "house keeper" or "pusher". The job of the "house keepers" is to find lead singers and to know which songs that each lead singer knows. Their job also includes finding lead dancers for the upcoming dance. He then goes to the announcer with the information. All dances are introduced in the Haudenosaunee language of the speaker. In some instances, instructions are provided to ensure that dances are carried out properly.

== Dances ==
The instruments used in the social dances in various combinations are the water drum, the horn rattle, hard sticks and the beating of the feet on the floor.

The social dances can be categorized into three types of step styles: "stomp," "fish" and "side-step shuffle". Stomp is a shuffling type of dance, the right foot leads and the left foot is brought up to meet the right. The feet "hit" the floor with just enough impact to maintain the beat of the song. Fish is a dance where each foot hits in two or more consecutive beats. Side-step shuffle is done by the women, the right foot and the left foot shuffle oppositely.
