= Ganondagan State Historic Site =

- Boughton Hill
- U.S. National Register of Historic Places
- U.S. National Historic Landmark
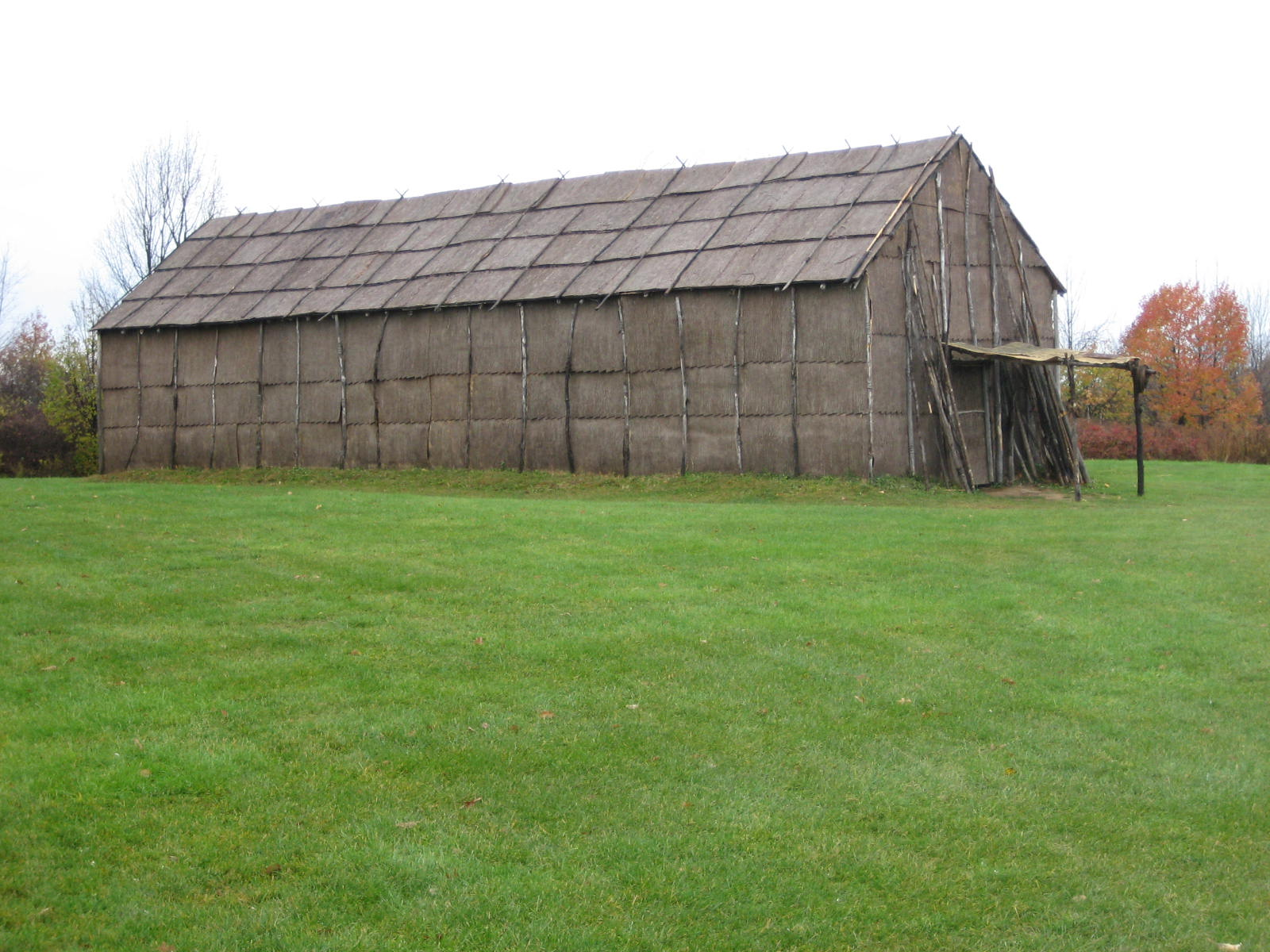
- Ganondagan Long House

- Location within New York
- Location: Victor, NY
- Coordinates: 42°57′40.16″N 77°24′45.85″W
- Built: 1670
- NRHP reference No.: 66000559

Significant dates
- Added to NRHP: October 15, 1966
- Designated NHL: July 19, 1964

Ganondagan State Historic Site, (pronounced ga·NON·da·gan) also known as Boughton Hill, is a Native American historic site in Ontario County, New York in the United States. Located at the site of the largest Seneca village of the 17th century, the site is in the present-day Town of Victor, southwest of the Village of Victor. Known in Seneca as Tganödagë:ën or Ganödagë:n, the village was also referred to in various spellings as Gannagaro, Canagora, Gandagora, Gandagaro and Gannontaa.

It consists of two areas: the 245-acre (99 ha) Boughton Hill portion, the area of longhouses and burials, has been designated as a National Historic Landmark. It has been identified as the location of the Jesuit Mission of St. Jacques (or St. James), which was mentioned in the Jesuit Relations. The Fort Hill portion was the location of a fortified granary and consists of 33 acres (13 ha); it is listed on the National Register of Historic Places. The complex is operated by the state of New York.

== History ==
=== Seneca traditions ===
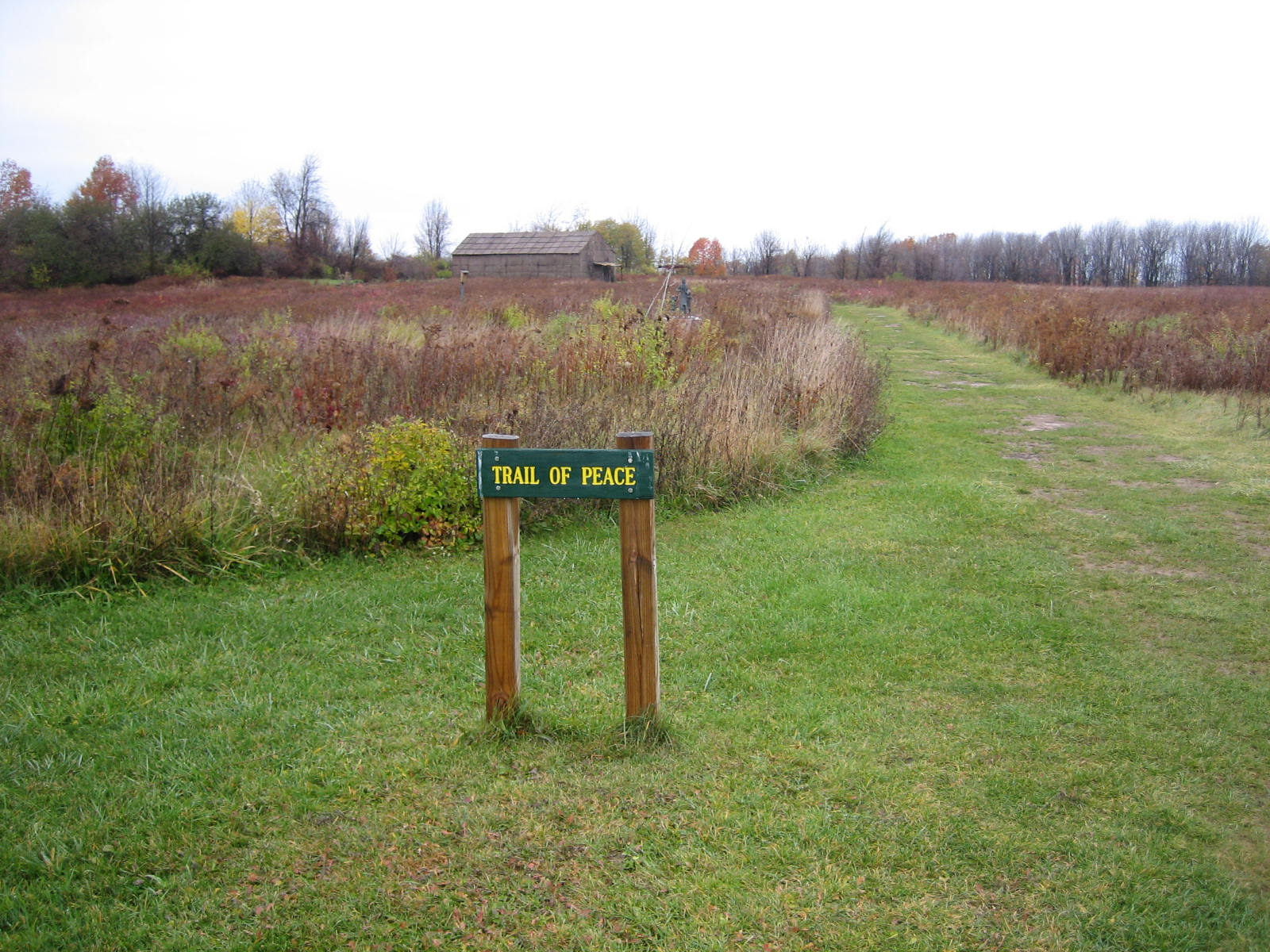
Trail of Peace

Like many indigenous peoples, the Seneca cultivated the Three Sisters: staple crops of corn, beans, and squash. Women bred and cultivated different varieties of each staple, experimenting with a range of seeds. These crops were typically grown near each other, so that beans could climb the cornstalks, and the typically large leaves of squashes would prevent weeds from growing.

Ganondagan was once the largest Seneca town; the Seneca nation was considered to occupy the western gateway of Haudenosaunee (Iroquois Confederacy) territory. This site is at the center of the story of the Peacemaker, who unified the five major peoples and created the Haudenosaunee confederacy. It survives to this day.

Seneca oral tradition tells of a Wendat man who arrived among the Mohawk speaking of the Gayaneshä'go꞉wa꞉h, the Great Law of Peace. This prophet is known today as The Great Peacemaker. The Mohawk, Oneida, and Cayuga pledged to join his proposed confederation and, following a dramatic interlude, the Seneca agreed also.

The discussion about how to bring in the Onondaga took place in the Ganondagan house of Jikonsase (or Jikonhsaseh), a Seneca woman elder now known as the "Mother of Nations." She proposed a solution which eventually brought the Onondaga into the fold, for it gave them a prominent place in the confederacy. She lived in the vicinity of Ganondagan, and is buried nearby.

Because of this tradition, the Seneca refer to Ganondagan as the "Town of Peace". They revere and protect the burial site of Jikonsase. The relation to their Great Law of Peace is more important than the attack that destroyed the village, for the people have carried forward their means of negotiating for solutions. The United States Senate acknowledged the contribution of the Iroquois Confederacy of Nations to the development of the United States Constitution in H.CON. RES 331 on October 5, 1988.

=== Contact with Europeans ===
In 1656, Jesuit Father Pierre-Joseph-Marie Chaumonot traveled from the Cayuga nation to the Seneca nation. Then, "Having assembled all the Elders of Gandagan, the principal village of Sonnontouan [the Seneca], and having bestowed the presents that are usually given as tokens of alliance, he commenced in a fervent and loud tone to explain the principal truths of the Gospel, which he sealed with the three finest presents of all, which he had reserved for this purpose."

By the close of 1668, the Jesuits had established a mission in each of the five Haudenosaunee nations; the Seneca, and the Mission of St. Jacques, had been assigned to Father James Fremin. The Seneca finally forced the missionaries to leave in 1684, after rising tension with the French.

In August 1669, René-Robert Cavelier, Sieur de La Salle, and Father René de Bréhant de Galinée, traveled to Ganondagan via Irondequoit. Galinée wrote:

This village, like all those of the Indians, is nothing but a lot of cabins, surrounded with palisades of poles twelve or thirteen feet high, fastened together at the top and planted in the ground, with great piles of wood the height of a man behind these palisades, the curtains being not otherwise flanked, merely a simple enclosure, perfectly square, so that these forts are not defensible.

— René Brehan de Galinée, (americanjourneys.org)

In 1677, Wentworth Greenhalgh, an English colonial government official, traveled to the Haudenosaunee nations and secured them as allies for the British. One of his stops was at Ganondagan, which he referred to as Canagora and as Canagorah:

Canagorah lyes on the top of a great hill, and in that, as well as in the bignesse, much like Onandago, contayning 150 houses, northwestward of Caiougo 72 miles. Here ye Indyans were very desirous to see us ride our horses, wch wee did: they made great feasts and dancing, and invited us yt when all ye maides were together, both wee and our Indyans might choose such as lyked us to ly with.

— Wentworth Greenhalgh, (The Documentary History of the State of New York/Volume I/Chapter I/Article II)

Greenhalgh wrote that none of the Seneca towns were "stockadoed" (stockaded), and related the following incident:

The 18th going to Canagorah, wee overtook ye prisoners; when the soudiers saw us they stopped each his prisoner, and made him sing, and cutt off their fingers, and slasht their bodies wth a knife, and when they had sung each man confessed how many men in his time hee had killed. Thatt day att Canagorah, there were most cruelly burnt four men, four women and one boy. The cruelty lasted about seven hours. When they were almost dead letting them loose to the mercy of ye boys, and taking the hearts of such as were dead to feast on.

— Wentworth Greenhalgh, (The Documentary History of the State of New York/Volume I/Chapter I/Article II)

In 1678, René-Robert Cavelier, Sieur de La Salle, and Father Louis Hennepin traveled to Ganondagan, which Hennepin called Tagorondies. Hennepin remarked on the presence of Jesuits Julien Garnier and Pierre Raffeix, and a "little Chapel made of Barks of Trees". About the inhabitants, he wrote:

These Savages are for the most part tall, and very well shap'd, cover'd with a sort of Robe made of Beavers and Wolves-Skins, or of black Squirrels, holding a Pipe or Calumet in their Hands. The Senators of Venice do not appear with a graver Countenance, and perhaps don't speak with more Majesty and Solidity, than those ancient Iroquese.

— Louis Hennepin, (Google Play)

=== Destruction of Ganondagan ===
On June 13, 1687, the Marquis de Denonville led an army from Canada, which consisted of 832 colonial regulars, more than 900 Canadian militia, and some 400 Indian allies, to eliminate the Seneca as competitors in the international fur trade. The Seneca had been dealing with the English, and the French wanted to keep control of the lucrative fur trade. The conflict was part of what became known as the Beaver Wars, as the Haudenosaunee also struggled to control their trade. Native American tribes fought each other, too, in trying to gain power in the fur trade.

Denonville writes that on July 13, the French force, closing in on Ganondagan, were attacked by a Seneca force of 800, but after a short engagement "they soon resolved to fly." Denonville described the French casualties as 5 or 6 killed and 20 wounded, while the Seneca casualties were 45 killed and 60 wounded. However, a British report, based on interviews of Seneca warriors, states that the Seneca force consisted of 450 people, including 350 boys, 100 men, and 5 women "who engaged as well as the men".

The British report states that most of the villagers had been moved that day to Cajouge (Cayuga) and some to a lake to the south. "As soon as the women and children were fled, their fired their own Castles." L'Abbe de Belmont wrote that the Seneca "came to reconnoiter us and then went to burn their village and take to flight." Upon the French arrival at the village on the 14th, Denonville reports, "we found it burned" and a nearby fort abandoned. The French killed "a vast quantity of hogs", and, from the four Seneca villages they visited, destroyed 1.2 million bushels of stored and standing corn. The force turned west and destroyed the village of Totiakton (aka Tiotohatton or La Conception) before returning to their boats at Irondequoit.

After the battle, the community movement was checked by the disaster of the French invasion and turned eastward. The two villages of Gandagora and Gandougarae seem to have joined in this eastward movement and to have settled first at Canandaigua and later in the region east of Canandaigua Lake.

During the American Revolutionary War, the Sullivan Expedition of 1779 attacked the Seneca in scattered towns at Geneva, Canandaigua and along Seneca Lake (New York) (see Kanadaseaga).

=== Later use ===
For more than a hundred years after the American Revolutionary War, the Seneca used this area for agriculture. In the 1930s, their chief Freeman Johnson began to work to preserve the property, as looters were stealing artifacts. In 1964 Boughton Hill was designated as a National Historic Landmark, and in 1987 the state historic park was established.

The Seneca have made many contributions to the United States throughout its history. The political ideals which the Seneca had were contributed to the U.S. Constitution. The Seneca's matrilineal kinship system gave considerable power to women, as inheritance and property were passed through the maternal line. Children were considered born into their mother's family and clan, which determined their social status. In 1848 at Seneca Falls, New York, American women created a proclamation of rights to achieve similar power. They did not receive the vote until 1920.

=== Today ===
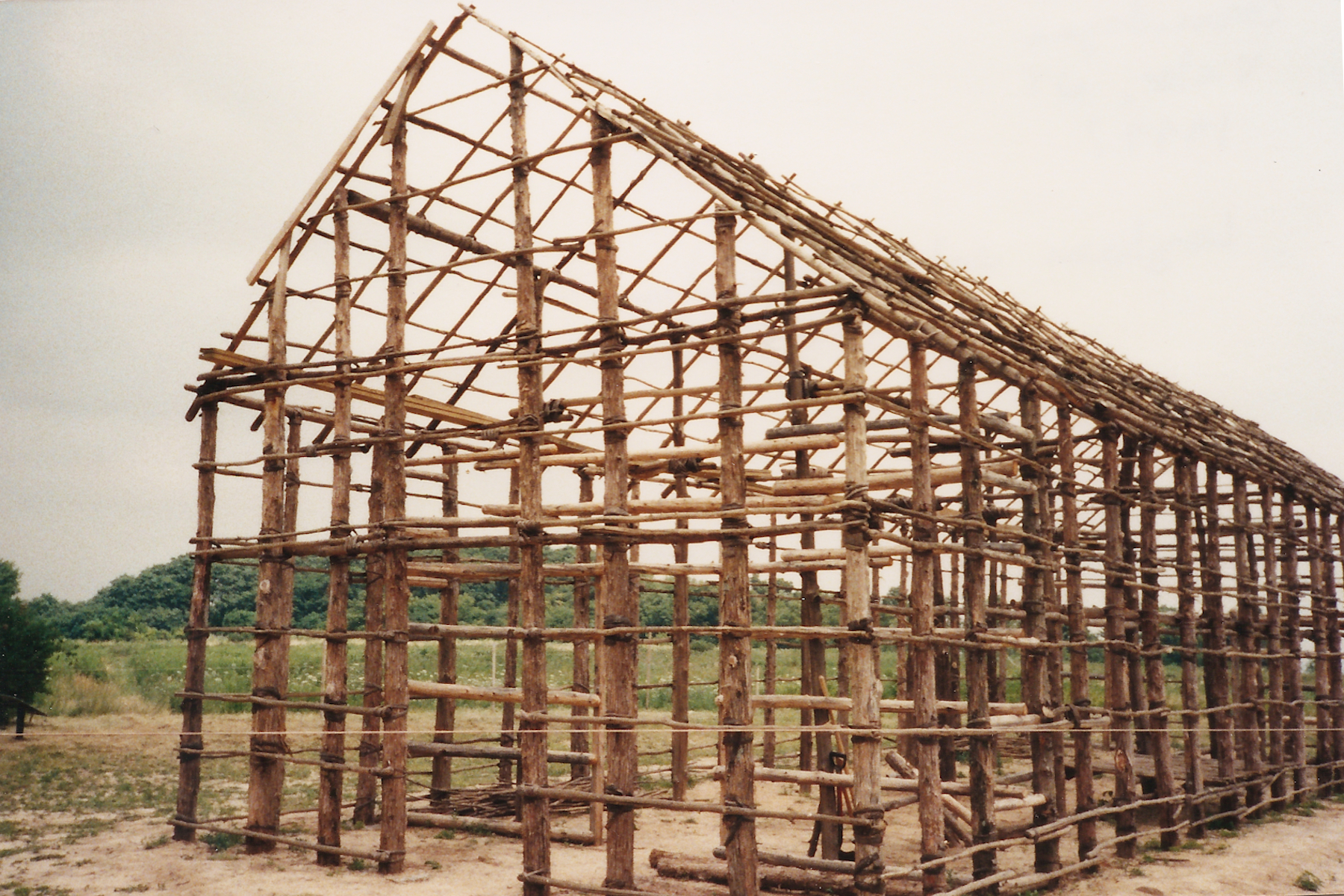
Longhouse under construction in 1997

Ganondagan, site of a major 17th-century Seneca village, has a reconstructed Seneca longhouse and a small visitors center. The original town site covered nine acres, with dwellings and stores, fields, and areas for livestock. This area was the location of nearly 150 longhouses, as well as the burial grounds of the people. The village was surrounded by extensive corn fields and a large, fortified granary was at the Fort Hill site. It was considered the "breadbasket" for the Haudenosaunee. The Seneca supplied many of the Haudenosaunee with corn.

The site includes miles of trails over more than 560 acres of property in the park. The Friends of Ganondagan have worked to preserve the Ganondagan land and Seneca cultural traditions.

== See also ==
- Albany Plan
- Haudenosaunee
- List of New York State Historic Sites
