= Caroline G. Parker =

Tonawanda Seneca activist and artist

Caroline Gahano Parker Mountpleasant
- Jigöhsahsë
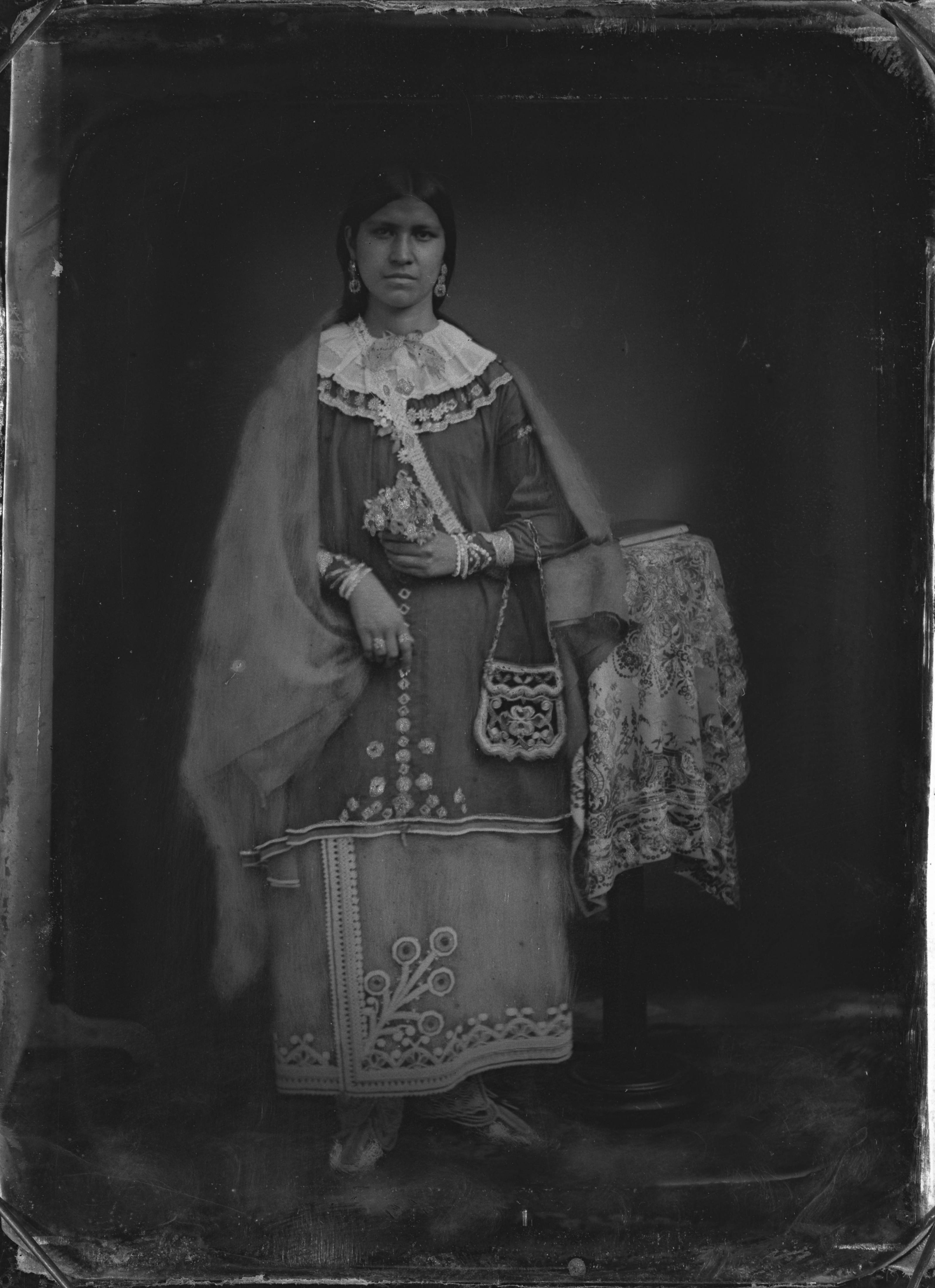
- Caroline G. Parker, ca. 1850
- Born: Caroline Gahano Parker c. 1826; Indian Falls, New York
- Died: 1892
- Occupations: Activist, intellectual, artist, teacher
- Spouse: John Mountpleasant

Caroline Gahano (Ga-Hah-No) Parker Mt. Pleasant (short for Mountpleasant by marriage), was an intellectual, activist, and embroiderer who was born into the Seneca Wolf Clan. For her important work in reviving community traditions, in 1853 the Tonawanda Seneca gave her the honorific name Jigonhsasee (Seneca: Jigöhsahsë, also spelled Jigonsahseh or Jiconsaseh), or “Peace Woman,” after a female founder of the Haudenosaunee Confederacy. Parker's network included the anthropologist Lewis Henry Morgan, who commissioned hundreds of confections from her for the New York State Cabinet of Natural History. Caroline Parker's textiles and beadwork styles blend Haudenosaunee and Victorian elements, which has exerted a lasting influence on Seneca and Tuscarora fashion.

== Biography ==
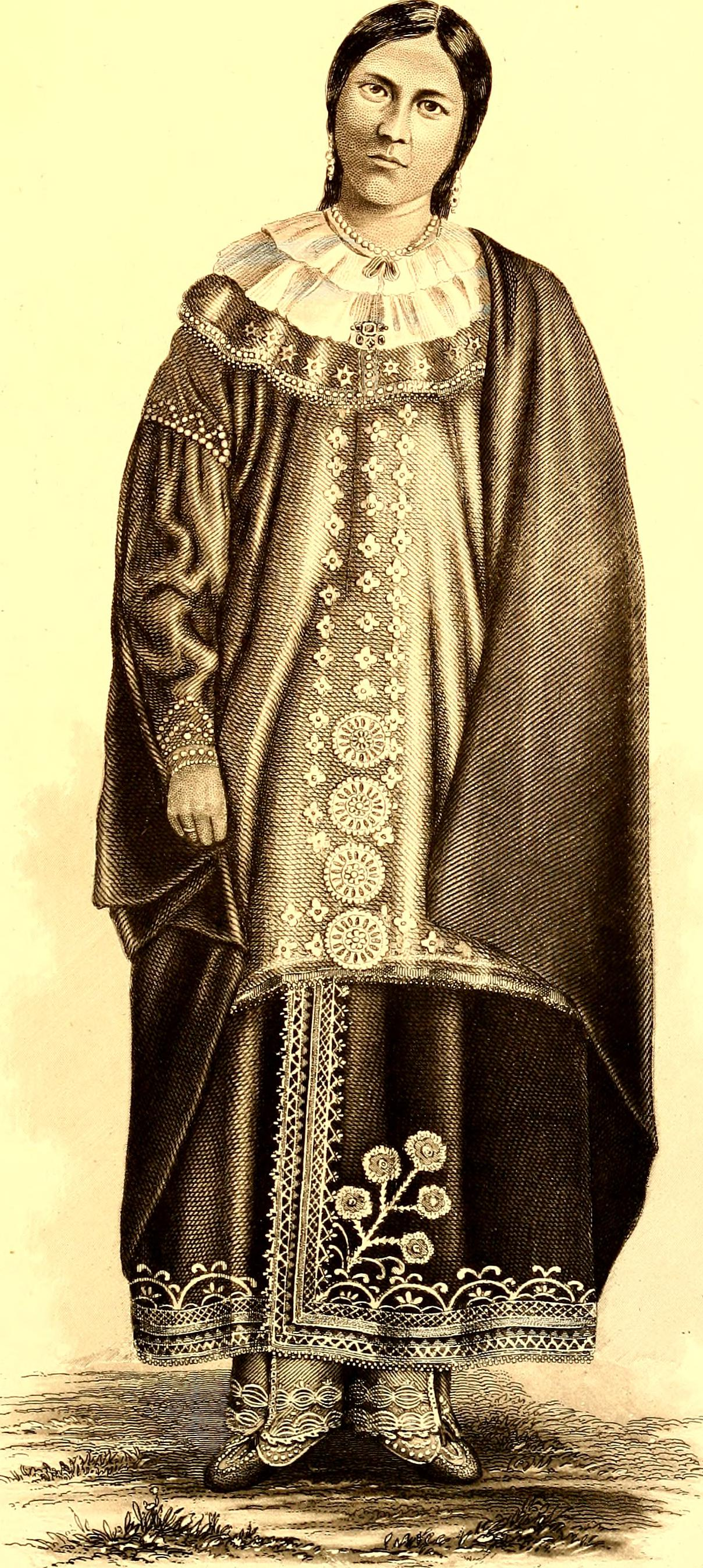
Ga-Hah-No, A Seneca Indian Girl in the Costume of the Iroquois. Frontispiece of Lewis H. Morgan’s 1851 publication, The League of the Ho-de-no-sau-nee or Iroquois. Patricia O. Klingenstein Library, New York Historical Society.

Caroline Parker was born around 1826 near Indian Falls, New York, as a member of the Tonawanda Band of Seneca (Tanöwöde' Onödowá'ga:' Yoindzade'). Parker was the only daughter born to matriarch Elizabeth and William Parker, who also had six sons. Her brother Ely S. Parker was a high-ranking Civil War General and aide-de-camp to General Ulysses S. Grant. Her family belonged to the prominent and powerful Wolf Clan. They practiced the Gaiwiyo:h, or Longhouse religion, a spirituality close to Christianity that emerged in the previous century under the leadership of their ancestor Sganyodaiyoʼ, also called Handsome Lake. The Parkers were among the Seneca who resisted forced removals west of the Mississippi River ordered by the Indian Removal Act of 1830. Elizabeth Parker was one of the signatories of the Haudenosaunee women's petition sent to President John Tyler to defend Indigenous lands.

Even though Elizabeth and William Parker did not read or write English, they were adamant that Caroline and her siblings receive a Western education, a strategy that would support continued efforts to negotiate with settlers and safeguard Seneca lands. Caroline frequently acted as a translator and mediator between her Native community and white settlers. In 1843, Parker attended the Baptist missionary school in Pembroke, along with her brothers.

In 1845, Parker met Lewis Henry Morgan, a burgeoning ethnologist and anthropologist interested in the Iroquois League (today known as the Haudenosaunee Confederacy). Morgan had met Ely one year earlier while accompanying a Seneca diplomatic delegation in Albany. Morgan, who found Parker "remarkable,” raised funds from his brotherhood, the Grand Order of the Iroquois (a largely white, male fraternal society), to finance Parker's admission to the Cayuga Academy, an elite school in Aurora, New York. In 1851, Morgan persuaded Congress to create ten places for Native Americans at the Albany State Normal School and ensured that Caroline was among them. She received her teaching diploma in the spring of 1852, as one of two Indigenous women to attend the university and one of the first Indigenous students to graduate.

Parker graduated from the State Normal School in Albany, New York in 1852 and worked as an English teacher, interpreter, and translator.

Morgan also established a reciprocal relationship with the Parker family. He published his first monograph in 1851 based on information he had received from the Parker family. This book, League of the Iroquois, featured a lithograph of Caroline as the frontispiece. The knowledge Caroline shared with Morgan was instrumental in reshaping his understanding of Haudenosaunee culture, kinship, and the importance of women in the community. In return, Morgan provided the Parker family with legal representation and support as they fought to preserve their lands. Morgan subsequently received state funding to build an ethnographic collection, commissioning approximately 500 objects from the Parkers, many of which were made by Caroline. Only 50 of these objects survive today after a fire in 1911 devastated much of the collection.

In 1853, the council of chiefs of the Tonawanda Seneca Reservation granted Parker the honorific title of Jigonsaseh, amplifying Parker’s already respected status in her community. Then, in 1855, Parker became a schoolteacher on the Tonawanda Reservation, where she taught English. She lived in her own house and helped manage her parents' farm while her brothers served in the U.S. Military.

Parker was also intimately involved in the politics of her community, acting as an interpreter for Tonawanda Chiefs. Caroline became the second wife to prominent Tuscarora Chief John Mountpleasant in 1864, and moved to the Tuscarora Reservation. Caroline’s marriage to Mountpleasant elevated her social status in both the Haudenosaunee and settler communities. Against her wishes, white settlers often referred to Caroline as “Queen of the Tuscaroras,” or “Queen of the Senecas.” Parker’s textile and beadwork practice, blending traditional Haudenosaunee designs with fashionable Victorian era styles, separated her even further from the period stereotypes that characterized Native peoples as “primitive” and “uncivilized.”

Parker opposed the Anglo-American colonization of Haudenosaunee lands. She demanded that the United States cease its attempts to eradicate Seneca culture and that the Seneca be allowed to live on an equal footing with other local communities. Together with her husband, Parker dedicated her time to “advocating for social, political, and cultural progressive reforms.” Parker’s persistent activism made her into an important and well-known historical figure within the public consciousness. Beginning in 1864, white settlers dressed up as the celebrated "Miss Mountpleasant” to sell trinkets and beaded souvenirs at Sanitary Commission Fairs in Albany. The appropriation situated Caroline amongst other historical Indigenous figures whose lives were mythicized and romanticized for white audiences at the fairs.

== Later life and death ==
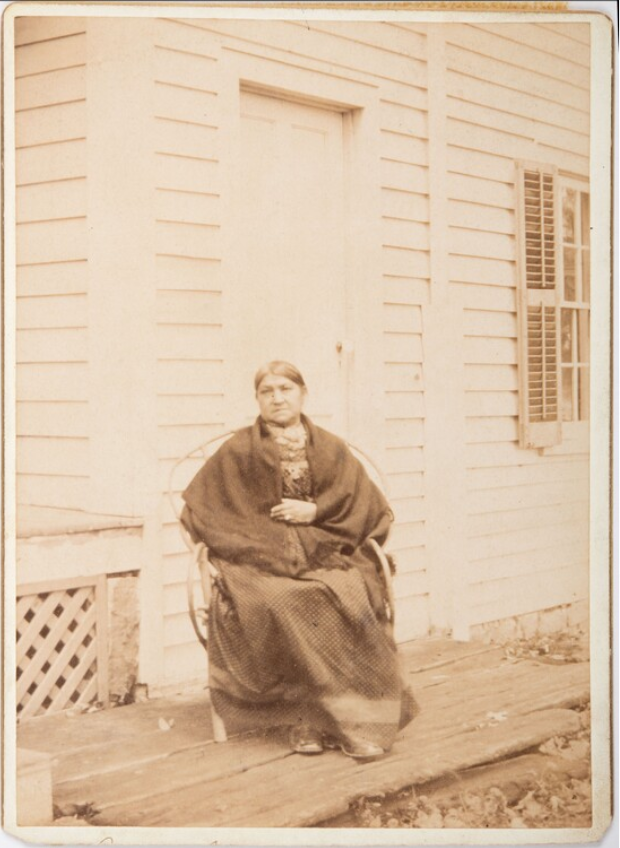
Parker seated at her home on the Tuscarora Reservation. Late nineteenth century.

After her husband’s death in 1887, Parker's life became more challenging. In 1890, she was employed to conduct a census of the "Indians" on the Tuscarora Reservation, a position that raised controversy in her community. At the same time, an aggressive legal battle broke out over her inheritance of Chief Mountpleasant’s estate. The courts ruled in favor of “Indian law,” allowing Parker to keep the material contents of the home, but barred ownership of the land she had inhabited with her husband for three decades.

The mounting legal pressures and constant stress weighed heavily on Parker, already in her late sixties. She died in 1892 of a stroke. Caroline was buried near her parents in a Baptist cemetery on the Tonawanda Reservation. The location of Parker’s burial went against the wishes of the Tuscarora chiefs who requested that she be laid to rest on the ancestral lands of her namesake, Jigonsaseh. Following her death, anthropologist and friend of Parker, Harriet Maxwell Converse, wrote an obituary in which she emphasized Caroline’s struggles against colonialism:

To the end of her days she opposed the division, in severalty, of the Indian lands to the state of New York believing that communal ownership, having been the custom of the great Iroquois nation from the earliest times, was an instinct which should not be combatted unless or better reasons than any that has yet been offered, and that the Indians had quite as good right to hold their treaty secured lands in common as had the Shakers or any other law abiding community.

== Bibliography ==
- Ahlberg Yohe, Jill; Teri Greeves; Laura Silver, et al. Hearts of Our People: Native Women Artists. Minneapolis Institute of Art in association with the University of Washington Press, 2019.
- Gutierrez, Jeanne. “Indigenous Peoples’ Day: Honoring Caroline Parker, Haudenosaunee Artist.” New-York Historical Society, October 8, 2021. https://www.nyhistory.org/blogs/indigenous-peoples-day-honoring-caroline-parker-haudenosaunee-artist.
- Holler, Deborah R. “Fashion, Nationhood and Identity.” American Indian Art Magazine 37, no. 4 (2012): 58–65.
- Holler, Deborah R. “The Remarkable Caroline G. Parker Mountpleasant, Seneca Wolf Clan.” Western New York Heritage, (April 15, 2011): 8–18.
- Kane, Maeve. Shirts Powdered Red: Haudenosaunee Gender, Trade, and Exchange across Three Centuries. Cornell University Press, 2023.
- Tooker, Elisabeth. Lewis H. Morgan on Iroquois Material Culture. University of Arizona Press, 1994.
