= Haudenosaunee =

Indigenous confederacy in North America

Haudenosaunee Confederacy
(in constituent languages)
Cayuga	Hodinǫ̱hsǫ́꞉nih
Mohawk	Rotinonhsón꞉ni or Rotinonhsyòn:ni
Oneida	Lotinuhsyu·niʼ or Lotinosho꞉ni
Onondaga	Ganųhcyų́·nih
Seneca	Hodínöhšö꞉ni꞉h
Tuscarora	Akunęhsyę̀·niˀ
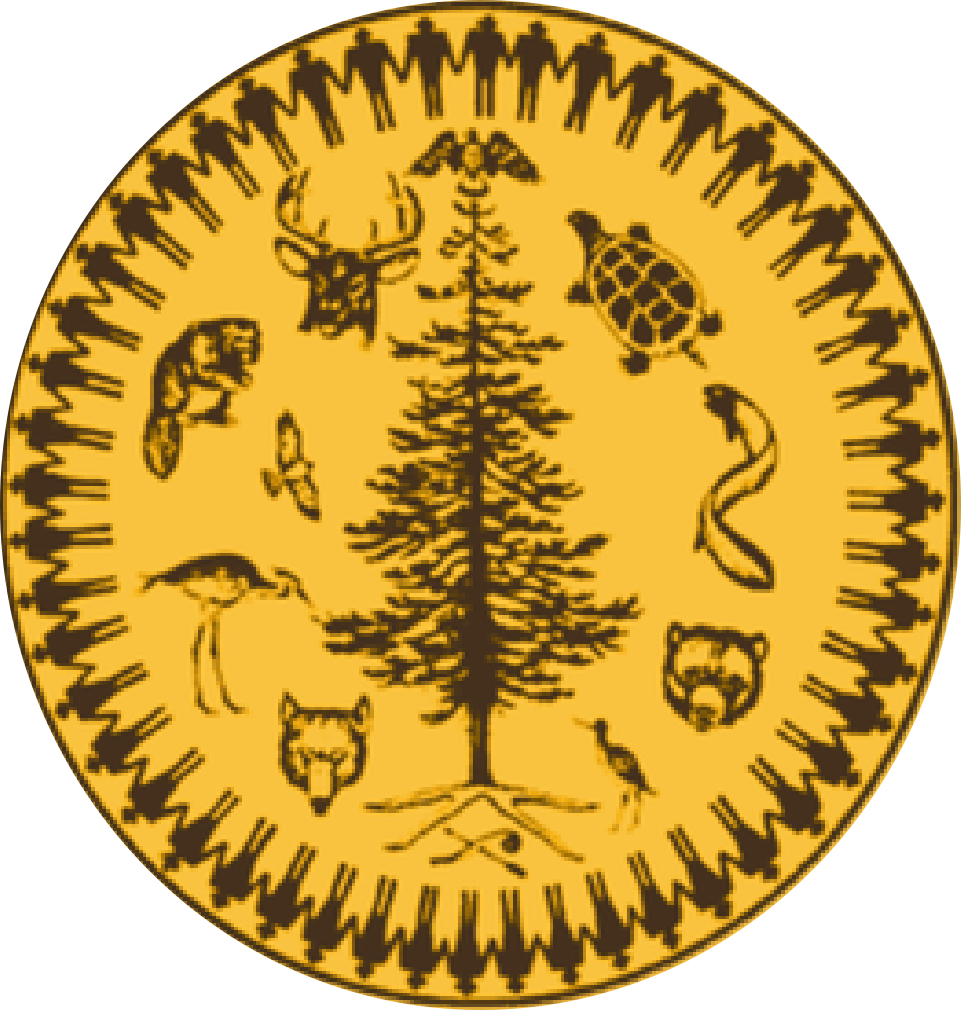
- Flag Seal

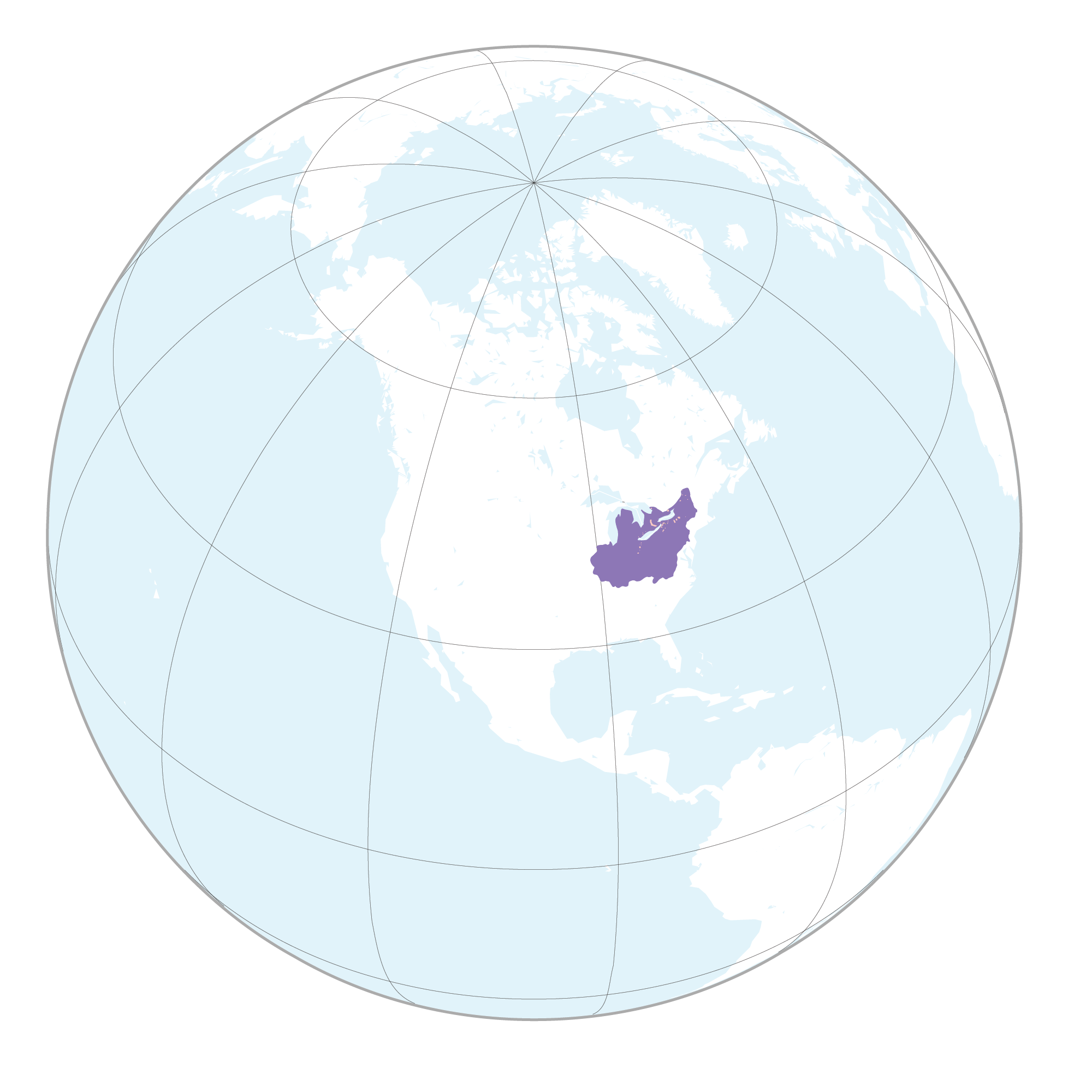
- Map showing historical (in purple) and currently recognized (in pink) Haudenosaunee territorial claims
- Status: Recognized confederation, later became an unrecognized government
- Capital: Onondaga (historical locations): Before 1609: Cazenovia, New York; 1609–1615: Pompey, New York; 1615–1640: Delphi Falls, New York; 1640–1682: Manlius, New York; 1720–1779: Onondaga Creek
- Common languages: Iroquoian languages, English
- Government: Confederation with consensus government
- Tadodaho
  - 2002–present: Sid Hill
- Legislature: Grand Council of the Six Nations

Formation
  - Great Law of Peace: between 1142 and 1450

The Haudenosaunee Confederacy (Note: Mohawk: Rotinonhsón꞉ni, IPA: [rodinũhˈsṹːni] or Rotinonhsyòn:ni, IPA: [rodinũhˈʃũ̀ːni]; Oneida: Lotinuhsyu·niʼ, IPA: [lodinũhʃũːniʔ] or Lotinosho꞉ni, IPA: [lodinoshũːni]; Onondaga: Ganǫhcyǫ́·nih or Ganoñhshyoñ·nih, IPA: [ganũhˈʃjṹːnih]; Cayuga: Hodinǫ̱hsǫ́꞉nih, IPA: [hodin̥õ̥hˈsṍːnih]; Seneca: Hodínöhšö꞉ni꞉h, IPA: [hodínɔ̃hˈʃɔ̃ːniːh]; Tuscarora: Akunęhsyę̀·niˀ, IPA: [agunə̃hʃə̃ːniʔ]) (/ˌhoʊdɪnoʊˈʃoʊni/ HOH-din-oh-SHOH-nee; lit. 'those who build the longhouse'), also known as the Iroquois, (Note: (/ˈɪrəkwɔɪ, -kwɑː/ IRR-ə-kwoy, -kwah)) is a confederacy of Iroquoian Indigenous peoples in northeast North America. They have also been called the Six Nations (Note: Mohawk: Iáia’k Nihononhontsá꞉ke; Onondaga: áhya’k nihonųhwęjyagéh; Cayuga: Hyeí Niyǫhwęjá꞉ge꞉; Seneca: Ye꞉i’ Níónöëdzage꞉h) (Five Nations (Note: Mohawk: Wísk Nihononhontsá꞉ke; Onondaga: hwiks nihonųhwęjyagéh; Cayuga: Hwíhs Niyǫhwęjá꞉ge꞉; Seneca: Wís Níónöëdzage꞉h) before 1722). The Haudenosaunee originally comprised (from east to west) the Mohawk, Oneida, Onondaga, Cayuga, and Seneca peoples. After 1722, the Iroquoian-speaking Tuscarora migrated from the southeast and were accepted into the Confederacy.

Haudenosaunee oral history describes the formation of the Confederacy by the Great Peacemaker, Hiawatha, and Jigonhsasee under a constitution known as the Great Law of Peace, likely between 1142 and 1660, although there is little agreement on the date. Contact with Europeans began with the arrival of Dutch colonists to North America, which the Haudenosaunee describe as the origin of the Two Row Wampum Treaty. The acquisition of muskets through the fur trade led to a rapid expansion in Haudenosaunee strength during the Beaver Wars, during which time they dispersed or assimilated most neighboring tribes. At its peak around 1700, Haudenosaunee power extended from what is today New York State, north into present-day Ontario and Quebec along the lower Great Lakes–upper St. Lawrence, and south on both sides of the Allegheny Mountains into present-day Virginia, Kentucky, and the Ohio Valley.

For nearly 200 years, the Haudenosaunee were a central player in North American geopolitics, often holding the balance of power between the French and British colonies. The Haudenosaunee eventually aligned with the British under the Covenant Chain, backing the British during the French and Indian War and securing protection from westward colonial expansion through the Royal Proclamation of 1763. During the American Revolution, Haudenosaunee unity collapsed, with the Oneida and Tuscarora fighting alongside the Patriots and the other nations of the Confederacy allying with the British. In the wake of American independence and the devastating Sullivan Expedition, many Haudenosaunee fled to British Canada, establishing the Six Nations of the Grand River reserve. Haudenosaunee territory in the United States was further reduced by a series of land cessions and sales, and political unity divided between numerous Tribal and First Nation governments. Nonetheless, the Haudenosaunee reestablished the Grand Council of the Confederacy after the Revolution and continue to consider themselves sovereign and independent. The Haudenosaunee issue their own passports and attempted to join the League of Nations in 1923.

In 2010, more than 45,000 enrolled Six Nations people lived in Canada, and over 81,000 in the United States. They retain sovereignty over seven reserves in Canada and eleven reservations in the United States, divided between seventeen First Nations and nine Tribal nations.

== Names ==
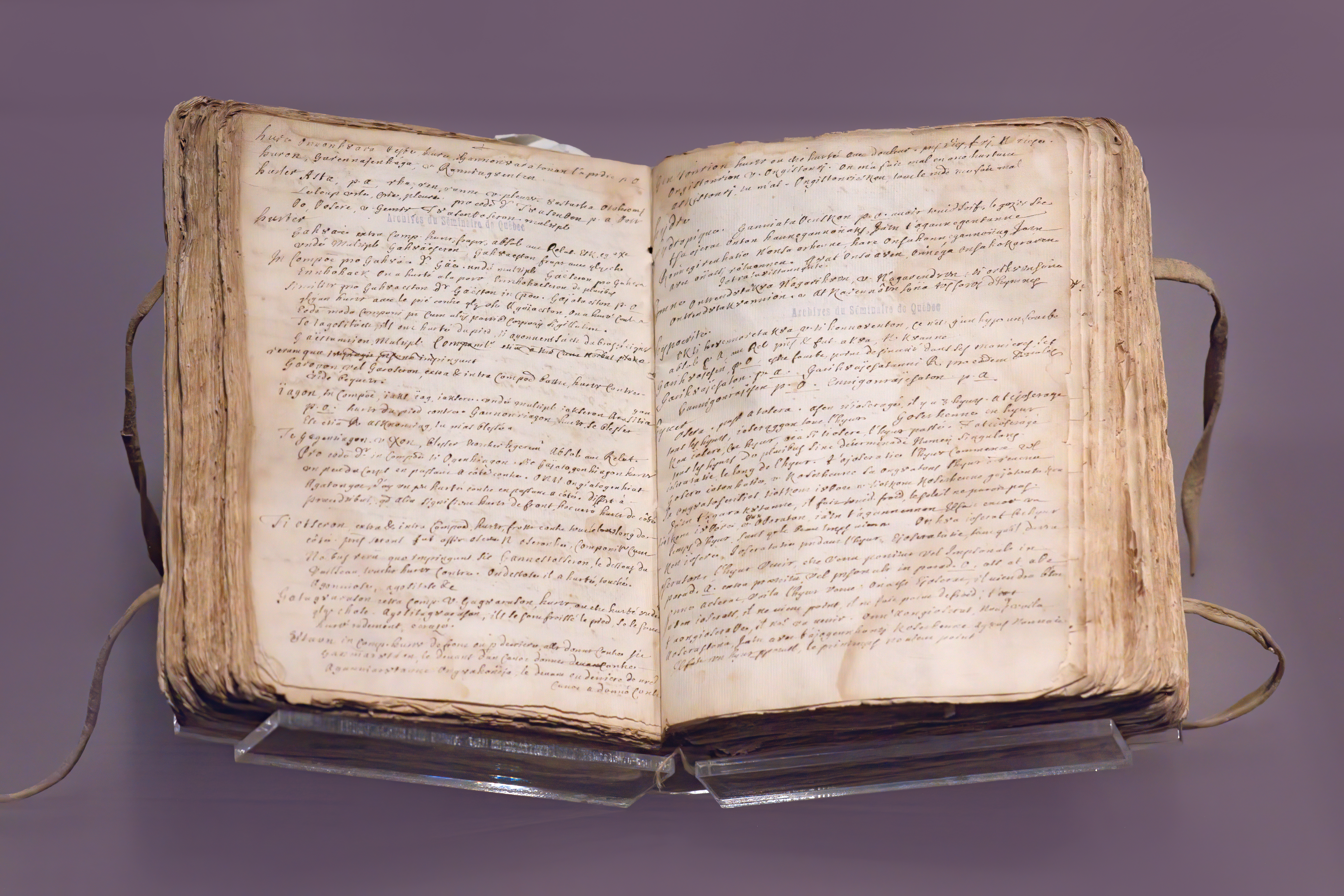
Iroquois dictionary, Jesuit fathers, Quebec, c. 1660

The autonym Haudenosaunee means "people of the longhouse", in reference to the metaphorical longhouse formed by the five original nations of the League. This "longhouse" stretched from the Mohawk Nation in the east to the Seneca Nation in the west, the former being designated the "Keepers of the Eastern Door" and the latter the "Keepers of the Western Door". Iroquois, the traditional exonym for the Haudenosaunee, is of obscure and debated origin, first appearing in the 1603 writings of the French explorer Samuel de Champlain. The descriptive term "Five Nations" (or, after 1722, "Six Nations") is also used, particularly in historical documents. A less common, older autonym for the people of the League is Ongweh’onweh, (Note: Mohawk: Onkwehón꞉we; Oneida: ukwehu·wé; Onondaga: ųgwehų́·weh; Cayuga: Ǫgwehǫ́꞉weh; Seneca: ögwé’ö꞉weh; Tuscarora: ękwehę̀·we) meaning "original people". The Haudenosaunee country has been called Iroquoia and Haudenosauneega in English, and Iroquoisie in French.

The Haudenosaunee were known by the French during the colonial years as the Iroquois League, and later as the Iroquois Confederacy. Modern scholars of the Haudenosaunee distinguish between the League and the Confederacy. According to this interpretation, the Haudenosaunee League is the ceremonial and cultural institution embodied in the Grand Council, which still exists, while the Haudenosaunee Confederacy was the decentralized political and diplomatic entity that emerged in response to European colonization and was dissolved after the British defeat in the American Revolutionary War. Today's Haudenosaunee do not make such a distinction, and use the terms interchangeably, but prefer the name "Haudenosaunee Confederacy".

== History ==
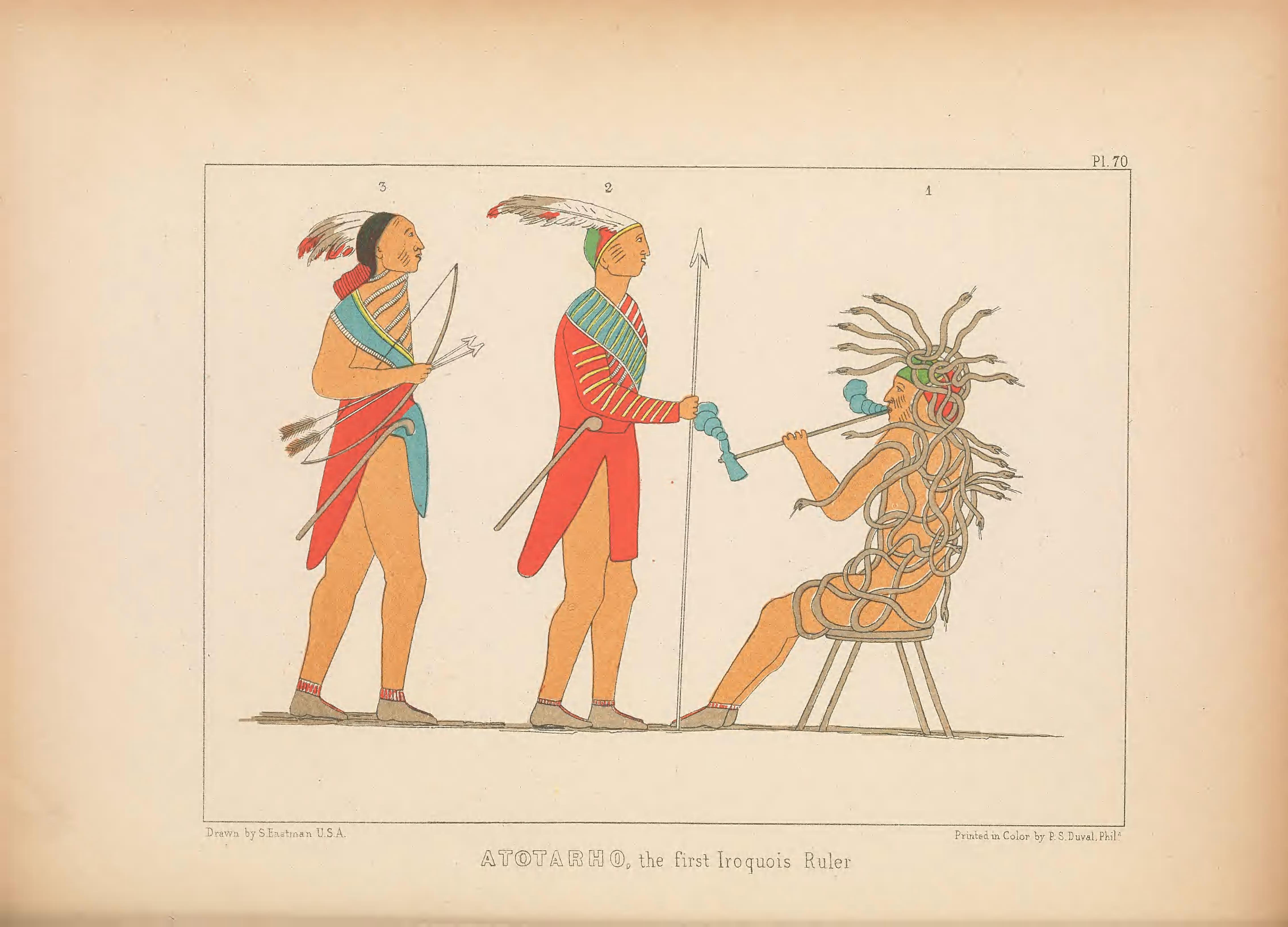
Haudenosaunee painting of Tadodaho receiving two Mohawk chiefs

=== Formation of the League ===
The Haudenosaunee League was established prior to European contact, with the banding together of five Iroquoian peoples living south of the Great Lakes into "The Great League of Peace". (Note: The American Heritage encyclopedia relates that Europeans learned about many interior tribes through the names given them by the Algonquian-speaking coastal tribes they encountered first, who referred to enemies in terms reflecting their competitive relationship. The editors add, that Iroquois was a polite name from such people, and its meaning is 'from the south', people of the south, or such similar name.) Many archaeologists and anthropologists believe that the League was formed about 1450, though arguments have been made for dates as early as the solar eclipse of August 31, 1142.

The founders of the League are traditionally held to be Dekanawida the Great Peacemaker, Hiawatha, and Jigonhsasee the Mother of Nations, whose home acted as a sort of United Nations. They brought the Peacemaker's Great Law of Peace to the five Iroquoian nations who were fighting, raiding, and feuding with each other and with other tribes, both Algonkian and Iroquoian. (Note: The American Heritage Book of Indians states that oral tradition recounts that other Iroquoian peoples were given the opportunity to join the league.) From east to west, the League was composed of the Mohawk, Oneida, Onondaga, Cayuga, and Seneca nations. Each nation involved had a distinct Iroquoian language, territory, and function in the League. The League itself is embodied in its Grand Council, an assembly of fifty chiefs, each representing a clan of a nation.

There were many other independent Iroquoian-speaking peoples outside the Haudenosaunee League. The Erie, Susquehannock, and Wendat (Huron) lived at various times along the St. Lawrence River and around the Great Lakes, often competing and warring with neighboring nations of the League. In the American Southeast, the Cherokee were another Iroquoian-language people who had migrated to that area centuries before European contact.

=== Seventeenth Century ===
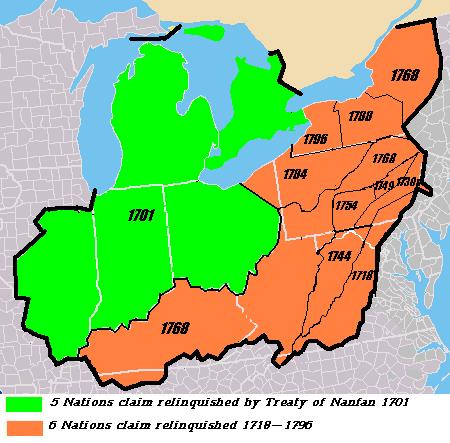
Map showing Haudenosaunee claims through the 1700s

Haudenosaunee contact with European settlers began with Dutch settlement of Fort Nassau, with whom the Haudenosaunee swiftly established a trading relationship. Haudenosaunee oral tradition holds that this meeting coincided with the establishment of the Two Row Wampum Treaty, a mutual agreement of coexistence and non-interference. The treaty was recorded on a belt made of silver and was referred to as The Silver Covenant Chain of Friendship.

Beginning in 1609, the League fought the decades-long Beaver Wars against the French, their Wendat allies, and other neighboring tribes, including the Petun, Erie, and Susquehannock. Trying to control access to game for the lucrative fur trade, they invaded the Algonquian peoples of the Atlantic coast (the Lenape, or Delaware), the Algonquian Anishinaabe of the boreal Canadian Shield region, and not infrequently the English colonies as well. During the Beaver Wars, they defeated and assimilated most of the Wendat (1649), Petun (1650), the Neutral Nation (1651), Erie (1657), and Susquehannock (1680). Some Haudenosaunee settled in mission villages along the St. Lawrence River, becoming more closely tied to the French. While they participated in French-led raids on Dutch and English colonial settlements, where some Mohawk and other Haudenosaunee settled, in general the Haudenosaunee resisted attacking their own peoples.

By the end of the century, the Haudenosaunee continued several wars against the French. During King William's War (North American part of the War of the Grand Alliance), the Haudenosaunee allied with the English. In July 1701, they concluded the "Nanfan Treaty", deeding some of their conquered land to the English (a large tract north of the Ohio River). Meanwhile, the Haudenosaunee were negotiating peace with the French; together they signed the Great Peace of Montreal that same year, with the participation of the leading Wyandot diplomat Kondiaronk.

=== Eighteenth Century ===
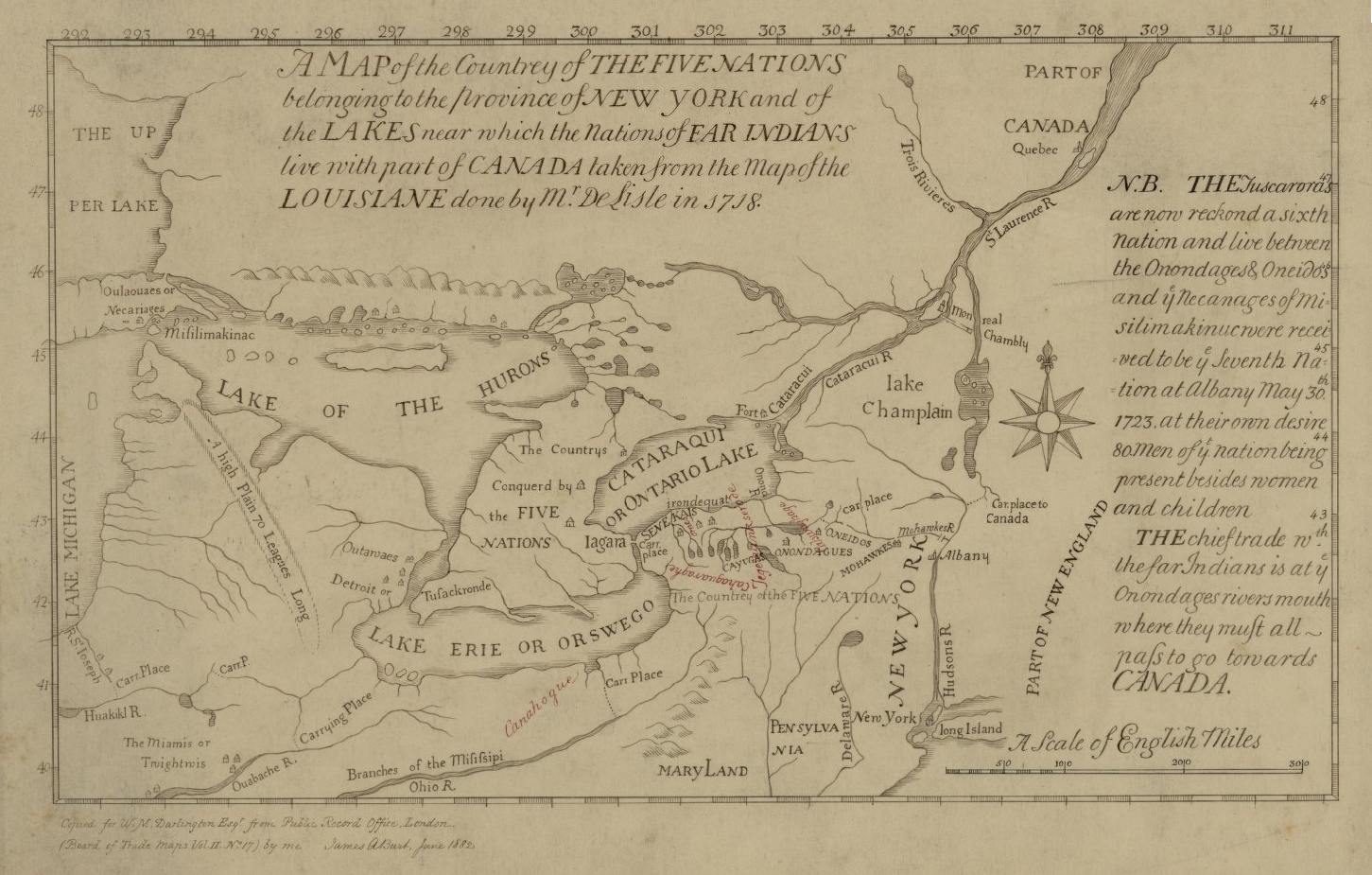
Map of the Five Nations from the Darlington Collection

In about 1722, the Iroquoian-speaking Tuscarora joined the League, having migrated northwards from the Carolinas after a bloody conflict with European settlers. A shared cultural background with the Five Nations of the Haudenosaunee, as well as a sponsorship from the Oneida, led to acceptance of the Tuscarora as the sixth nation in the confederacy in 1722; the Haudenosaunee become known afterwards as the Six Nations.

The Haudenosaunee continued to be involved in wars between France and England in the eighteenth century. During Queen Anne's War (the North American part of the War of the Spanish Succession), they helped plan attacks against the French. During the French and Indian War, the Haudenosaunee briefly fought on both sides while trying to maintain neutrality. By the end, the Haudenosaunee joined the British after they took Louisbourg and Fort Frontenac. After the war, to protect their alliance, the British government issued the Royal Proclamation of 1763, forbidding white settlement beyond the Appalachian Mountains. American colonists resented and largely ignored the order, and the British had insufficient soldiers to enforce it. Faced with confrontations, the Haudenosaunee agreed to adjust the line again in the Treaty of Fort Stanwix (1768).

During the American Revolution, traditional League unity broke down in the face of requests for aid from the British Crown.. The Oneida and Tuscarora supported the American colonists, while the rest of the Haudenosaunee League (the Cayuga, Mohawk, Onondaga, and Seneca) sided with the British and Loyalists. At the war's conclusion with the 1783 Treaty of Paris, the British ceded Haudenosaunee territory in New York to the United States without provisions for the Haudenosaunee. The Crown gave the Haudenosaunee land in Canada in compensation for the five million acres they had lost in the south, but it was not equivalent to earlier territory.

After the migration of a majority to Canada, the Haudenosaunee remaining in New York were required to live mostly on reservations. In 1784, a remnant of 6,000 Haudenosaunee faced 240,000 New Yorkers, with land-hungry New Englanders poised to migrate west. "Oneidas alone, who were only 600 strong, owned six million acres, or about 2.4 million hectares. Iroquoia was a land rush waiting to happen." By the War of 1812, the Haudenosaunee had lost control of much territory. Another Treaty of Fort Stanwix was signed with the new United States in 1784, whereby the Haudenosaunee ceded much of their historical homeland to the United States, followed by the 1794 treaty of Canandaigua which ceded even more land to the Americans. After this, the Haudenosaunee in New York become demoralized, as more of their land was sold to land speculators while alcoholism, violence, and broken families plagued their reservations. The Oneida and the Cayuga sold almost all their land and moved to Canada or the Ohio Country.

==== In the west ====
Many Haudenosaunee (mostly Mohawk) and Haudenosaunee-descended Métis people living in Lower Canada (primarily at Kahnawake) took employment with the Montreal-based North West Company during its existence from 1779 to 1821, and became voyageurs or free traders in the North American fur trade as far west as the Rocky Mountains. They are known to have settled around Jasper's House and possibly as far west as the Finlay River and north as far as the Pouce Coupe and Dunvegan areas.

==== Canadian Haudenosaunee ====
During the 18th century, the Catholic Canadian Haudenosaunee outside Montreal reestablished ties with the League Haudenosaunee. During the American Revolution, the Canadian Haudenosaunee declared their neutrality and refused to fight for the Crown, despite the offers of Sir Guy Carleton, the governor of Quebec. In the War of 1812, the Canadian Haudenosaunee again declared neutrality. The Canadian Haudenosaunee communities at Kanesatake and Kahnawake were prosperous settlements in the 19th century, supporting themselves with farming and the sale of sleds, snowshoes, boats, and baskets. In 1884, about 100 Canadian Haudenosaunee were hired by the British government to serve as river pilots and boatmen for the relief expedition of the besieged General Charles Gordon in Khartoum in the Sudan, taking the force commanded by Field Marshal Wolseley up the Nile from Cairo to Khartoum. On their way back to Canada, the Canadian Haudenosaunee river pilots and boatmen stopped in London, where they were personally thanked by Queen Victoria for their services. In 1886, when a bridge was being built at the St. Lawrence, a number of Haudenosaunee men from Kahnawke were hired to help in the construction, and proved so skilled as steelwork erectors that since that time, a number of bridges and skyscrapers in Canada and the U.S. have been built by Haudenosaunee steelmen.

=== 20th century ===
==== World War I ====
During World War I, Canada encouraged First Nations men to enlist in the Canadian Expeditionary Force (CEF), where their hunting skills made them excellent snipers and scouts, particularly the warlike Haudenosee and the especially fierce Mohawk. About half the 4,000 or so First Nations men who served in the CEF were Haudenosaunee. Men from the Six Nations reserve at Brantford were encouraged to join the 114th Haldimand Battalion (Brock's Rangers) of the CEF, where two entire companies including officers were all Haudenosaunee. The 114th Battalion was formed in December 1915, and broken up in November 1916 to provide reinforcements for other battalions. A Mohawk from Brantford, William Forster Lickers, who enlisted in the CEF in September 1914, was captured at the Second Battle of Ypres in April 1915, where he was savagely beaten by his captors, as one German officer wanted to see if "Indians could feel pain". Lickers was left paralyzed for life, while the officer was well pleased to see that Indians did indeed feel pain.

The Six Nations council at Brantford tended to see themselves as a sovereign nation allied to the Crown through the Covenant Chain going back to the 17th century, and thus allied to King George V personally, rather than under the authority of Canada. One Haudenosaunee clan mother, in a letter of August 1916 to a CEF recruiting sergeant who refused her teenage son as underage, declared the Six Nations were not subject to the laws of Canada and he had no right to refuse him. As she explained, the Haudenosaunee were not serving Canada, but giving military support directly to their ally King George V.

==== League of Nations ====
At the end of the War of 1812, Britain shifted Indian affairs from the military to civilian control. With the creation of the Canadian Confederation in 1867, civil authority, and thus Indian affairs, passed to Canadian officials with Britain retaining control of military and security matters. During World War I, an act attempted to conscript Six Nations men for military service. Under the Soldiers Resettlement Act, legislation was introduced to redistribute native land. Finally in 1920, an Act was proposed to force citizenship on "Indians" with or without their consent, which would then automatically remove their share of any tribal lands from tribal trust and make the land and the person subject to the laws of Canada.

The Haudenosaunee hired a lawyer to defend their rights in the Supreme Court of Canada. The Supreme Court refused to take the case, declaring that the members of the Six Nations were British citizens. In effect, as Canada was at the time a division of the British government, it was not an international state, as defined by international law. In contrast, the Haudenosaunee Confederacy had been making treaties and functioning as a state since 1643 and all of their treaties had been negotiated with Britain, not Canada. As a result, a decision was made in 1921 to send a delegation to petition King George V, whereupon Canada's External Affairs division blocked issuing passports. In response, the Haudenosaunee began issuing their own passports and sent Levi General, the Cayuga chief Deskaheh, to England with their attorney. Winston Churchill dismissed their complaint claiming that it was within the realm of Canadian jurisdiction and referred them back to Canadian officials.

On December 4, 1922, Charles Stewart, Superintendent of Indian Affairs, and Duncan Campbell Scott, Deputy Superintendent of the Canadian Department of Indian Affairs traveled to Brantford to negotiate a settlement on the issues with the Six Nations. After the meeting, the Native delegation brought the offer to the tribal council, as was customary under Haudenosaunee law. The council agreed to accept the offer, but before they could respond, the Royal Canadian Mounted Police conducted a liquor raid on the Haudenosaunee's Grand River territory. The siege lasted three days and prompted the Haudenosaunee to send Deskaheh to Washington, D.C., to meet with the chargé d'affaires of the Netherlands asking the Dutch Queen to sponsor them for membership in the League of Nations. Under pressure from the British, the Netherlands reluctantly refused sponsorship.

Deskaheh and the tribal attorney proceeded to Geneva and attempted to gather support. "On 27 September 1923, delegates representing Estonia, Ireland, Panama and Persia signed a letter asking for communication of the Six Nations' petition to the League's assembly," but the effort was blocked. Six Nations delegates traveled to The Hague and back to Geneva attempting to gain supporters and recognition, while back in Canada, the government was drafting a mandate to replace the traditional Haudenosaunee Confederacy Chiefs Council with one that would be elected under the auspices of the Canadian Indian Act. In an unpublicized signing on September 17, 1924, Prime Minister Mackenzie King and Governor-General Lord Byng of Vimy signed the Order in Council, which set elections on the Six Nations reserve for October 21. Only 26 ballots were cast.

The long-term effect of the Order was that the Canadian government had wrested control over the Haudenosaunee trust funds from the Haudenosaunee Confederation and decades of litigation would follow. In 1979, over 300 Indian chiefs visited London to oppose Patriation of the Canadian Constitution, fearing that their rights to be recognized in the Royal Proclamation of 1763 would be jeopardized. In 1981, hoping again to clarify that judicial responsibilities of treaties signed with Britain were not transferred to Canada, several Alberta Indian chiefs filed a petition with the British High Court of Justice. They lost the case but gained an invitation from the Canadian government to participate in the constitutional discussions which dealt with protection of treaty rights.

==== U.S. Indian termination policies ====
In the period between World War II and The Sixties, the U.S. government followed a policy of Indian Termination for its Native citizens. In a series of laws attempting to mainstream tribal people into European American society, the government strove to end the U.S. government's recognition of tribal sovereignty, eliminate trusteeship over Indian reservations, and implement state law applicability to native persons. In general, the laws were expected to create taxpaying citizens, subject to state and federal taxes as well as laws, from which Native people had previously been exempt.

On August 13, 1946, the Indian Claims Commission Act of 1946, Pub. L. No. 79-726, ch. 959, was passed. Its purpose was to settle for all time any outstanding grievances or claims the tribes might have against the U.S. for treaty breaches, unauthorized taking of land, dishonorable or unfair dealings, or inadequate compensation.

On July 2, 1948, Congress enacted [Public Law 881] 62 Stat. 1224, which transferred criminal jurisdiction over offenses committed by and against "Indians" to the State of New York. It covered all reservations' lands within the state and prohibited the deprivation of hunting and fishing rights which might have been guaranteed to "any Indian tribe, band, or community, or members thereof." It further prohibited the state from requiring tribal members to obtain fish and game licenses. During congressional hearings on [Public Law 785] 64 Stat. 845, tribes strongly opposed its passage, fearful that states would deprive them of their reservations. The State of New York disavowed any intention to break up or deprive tribes of their reservations and asserted that they did not have the ability to do so.

On August 1, 1953, U.S. Congress issued a formal statement, House concurrent resolution 108, which was the formal policy presentation announcing the official federal policy of Indian termination. The resolution called for the "immediate termination of the Flathead, Klamath, Menominee, Potawatomi, and Turtle Mountain Chippewa, as well as all tribes in the states of California, New York, Florida, and Texas." All federal aid, services, and protection offered to these Native peoples were to cease, and the federal trust relationship and management of reservations would end. Individual members of terminated tribes were to become full U.S. citizens with all the rights, benefits and responsibilities of any other U.S. citizen. The resolution also called for the Interior Department to quickly identify other tribes who would be ready for termination in the near future.

Beginning in 1953, a Federal task force began meeting with the tribes of the Six Nations. Despite tribal objections, legislation was introduced into Congress for termination. The proposed legislation involved more than 11,000 Indians of the Haudenosaunee Confederation and was divided into two separate bills. One bill dealt with the Mohawk, Oneida of New York and Wisconsin, Onondaga, Cayuga and Tuscarora tribes, and the other dealt with the Seneca. The arguments the Six Nations made in their hearings with committees were that their treaties showed that the U.S. recognized that their lands belonged to the Six Nations, not the U.S., and that "termination contradicted any reasonable interpretation that their lands would not be claimed or their nations disturbed" by the federal government. The bill for the Haudenosaunee Confederation died in committee without further serious consideration.

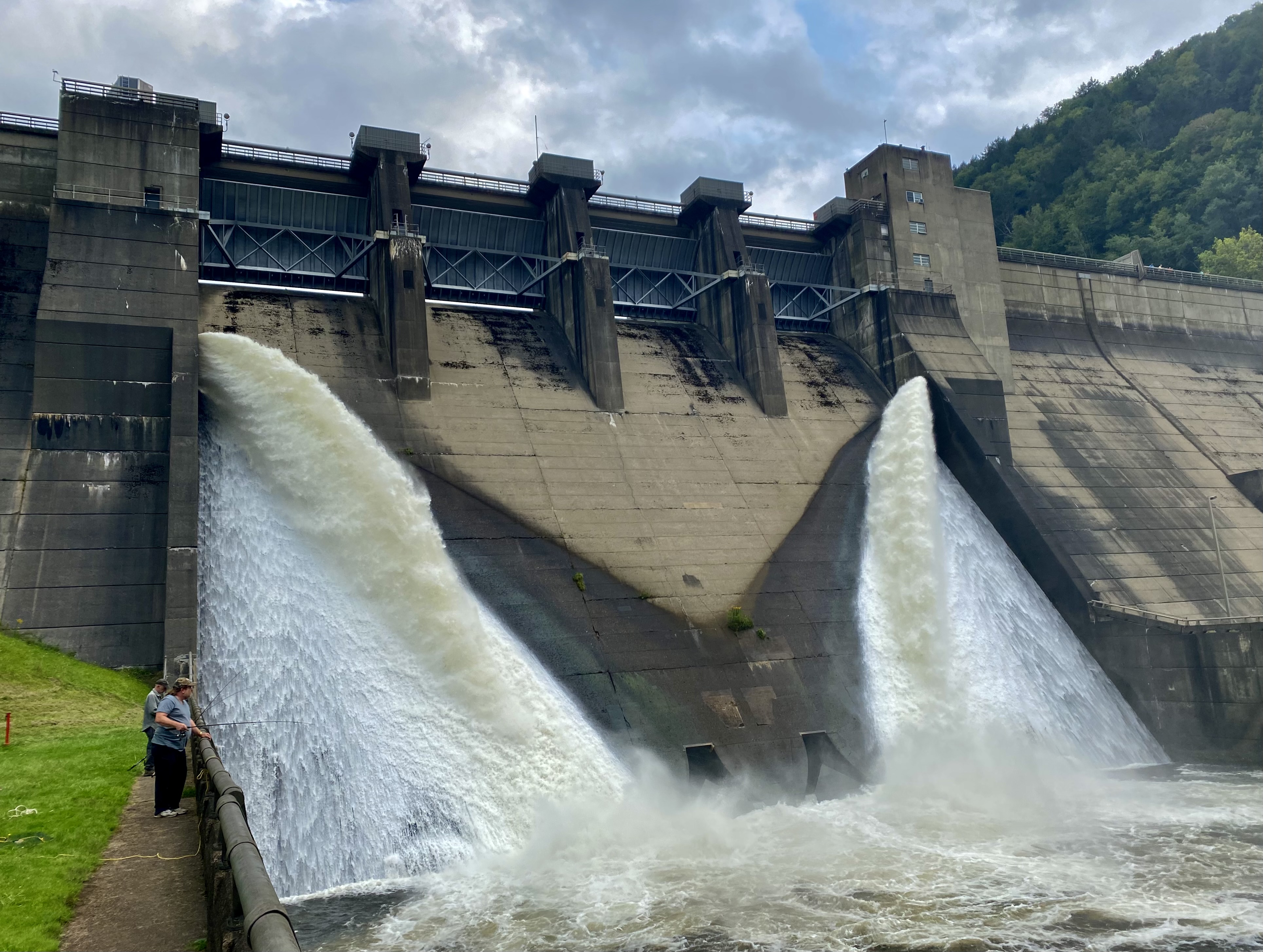
The Kinzua Dam in September 2021

On August 31, 1964, H. R. 1794 An Act to authorize payment for certain interests in lands within the Allegheny Indian Reservation in New York was passed by Congress and sent to the president for signature. The bill authorized payment for resettling and rehabilitation of the Seneca of the Cornplanter Tract who were being dislocated by the construction of the Kinzua Dam on the Allegheny River. Though only 127 Seneca families (about 500 people) were being dislocated, the legislation benefited the entire Seneca Nation, because the taking of the reservation land for the dam abridged a 1794 treaty agreement. In addition, the bill provided that within three years, a plan from the Interior Secretary should be submitted to Congress withdrawing all federal supervision over the Seneca Nation, though technically civil and criminal jurisdiction had lain with the State of New York since 1950.

Accordingly, on September 5, 1967, a memo from the Department of the Interior announced proposed legislation was being submitted to end federal ties with the Seneca. In 1968 a new liaison was appointed from the BIA for the tribe to assist the tribe in preparing for termination and rehabilitation. The Seneca were able to hold off termination until President Nixon issued his Special Message to the Congress on Indian Affairs in July 1970. No New York tribes then living in the state were terminated during this period.

One tribe that had formerly lived in New York did lose its federal recognition. The Emigrant Indians of New York included the Oneida, Stockbridge-Munsee, and Brothertown Indians of Wisconsin. In an effort to fight termination and force the government into recognizing their outstanding land claims in New York, the three tribes filed litigation with the Claims Commission in the 1950s. They won their claim on August 11, 1964. Public Law 90-93 81 Stat. 229 Emigrant New York Indians of Wisconsin Judgment Act established federal trusteeship to pay the Oneida and Stockbridge-Munsee, effectively ending Congressional termination efforts for them. Though the law did not specifically state the Brothertown Indians were terminated, it authorized all payments to be made directly to each enrollee, with special provisions for minors to be handled by the Secretary. The payments were not subject to state or federal taxes.

==== Oka Crisis ====
In 1990, a long-running dispute over ownership of land at Oka, Quebec, caused a violent stand-off. The Mohawk reserve of Kanesatake at Oka had become dominated by a group called the Mohawk Warrior Society that engaged in practices that American and Canadian authorities considered smuggling across the U.S.-Canada border, and were well armed with assault rifles. On July 11, 1990, the Mohawk Warrior Society tried to stop the building of a golf course on land claimed by the Mohawk people, which led to a shoot-out between the Warrior Society and the Sûreté du Québec that left a policeman dead. In the resulting Oka Crisis, the Warrior Society occupied both the land that they claimed belonged to the Mohawk people and the Mercier bridge linking the Island of Montreal to the south shore of the St. Lawrence River. On August 17, 1990, Quebec Premier Robert Bourassa asked for the Canadian Army to intervene to maintain "public safety", leading to the deployment of the Royal 22^{e} Régiment to Oka and Montreal. The stand-off ended on September 26, 1990, with a melee between the soldiers and the warriors. The dispute over ownership of the land at Oka continues.

== Society ==
=== Clans ===
Within each of the Six Nations, people belonged to a number of matrilineal clans. The number of clans varies by nation, currently from three to eight, with a total of nine different clan names.

Current clans
Seneca	Cayuga	Onondaga	Tuscarora	Oneida	Mohawk
Wolf (Honö́ta꞉yö꞉nih)	Wolf (Honǫtahyǫ́꞉ni꞉)	Wolf (Hothahyųníh)	Wolf (Θkwarì·nę)	Wolf (Thayú꞉ni)	Wolf (Okwáho)
Bear (Hodidzöníʼga꞉ʼ)	Bear (Hadihnyagwái)	Bear (Ohgwá·ih)	Bear (Uhčíhręˀ)	Bear (Ohkwá꞉li)	Bear (Ohkwá꞉ri)
Turtle (Hadínyahdë꞉h)	Turtle (Hadinyáhdę꞉)	Turtle (Hadi·nyáhdęh)	Turtle (Ráˀkwihs)	Turtle (A'no꞉wál)	Turtle (A’nó꞉wara)
Sandpiper/Snipe (Hodíʼnehsi꞉yoʼ)	Sandpiper (Hodiˀnehsí:yoˀ)	Snipe (Dahwisdahwís)	Sandpiper (Tawístawis)	—	—
Deer (Hodí꞉nyögwaiyoʼ)	—	Deer (Sgęnędųhé·nųʼ) (Note: or Deyodijinaeñ’doñ·da’)	Deer (Kàˀwí꞉ñu)	—	—
Beaver (Hodígëʼge꞉ga꞉ʼ)	—	Beaver (Honaga·ya’gih)	Beaver (Rakinęhá·ha·ˀ)	—	—
(Great Blue) Heron (Hodidáë́ʼö꞉ga꞉ʼ)	Heron (Degaǫhyága̱hne:ˀ)	Heron (Degaeñhyagáhä·’)	—	—	—
(Red-tailed) Hawk/Eagle (Hodíswëʼgaiyoʼ)	Hawk (Hodihswę̱ˀgáiyoˀ)	Hawk (Gwiyęʼgwiyę́·ʼ or Hadishwęʼgáiyoh) (Note: also Degaya’dakhwa’ or Odishweñ’gai·yo’)	—	—	—
—	—	Eel (Ogų·dé·naˀ)	Eel (Akunęhukwatíha·ˀ)	—	—

=== Clothing ===
A representation of a Seneca man in traditional dress

Traditionally, the bodies and faces of Haudenosaunee men were heavily painted and their noses and ears were pieced with rings made up of wampum or silver. The men usually shaved most of their hair and leaving only a tuft in the center, giving the name Mohawk to their hairstyle. Married women wore their hair in a single braid held in place by a comb, while the unmarried wore their hair in several braids. Warriors wore moccasins, leggings and short kilts and on occasion painted robes. During times of war, the faces and bodies of the warriors were painted half red, half black. A cap made of buckskin or cloth tied to wood splints called the gustoweh was decorated with feathers was often worn by men. Later, feathers in the gustoweh denoted the wearer's nation by their number and positioning.

A representation of a Seneca woman in traditional dress

Haudenosaunee clothing changed rapidly following the introduction of scissors, needles, and textiles obtained from the Europeans. In the 17th century women normally went topless with a buckskin skirt in the warm months, covering their upper bodies with a cape-like upper garment with an opening for the head in winter. By the 18th century, red and blue cloth obtained from Europeans became the standard material for clothing, with the men and women wearing blouses and shirts, usually decorated with beadwork, quillwork, and ribbons, and often worn alongside silver accessories. Reflecting European influence, Haudenosaunee women began to abandon their traditional topless style of dressing in the warm months in favor of long, loose-fitting overdresses Men's clothing, initially made of buckskin and decorated with porcupine quill-work, was likewise later made of broadcloth obtained from Europeans.

By the 1900s most Haudenosaunee wore the same clothing as their non-Haudenosaunee neighbors. Today most nations primarily wear their traditional clothing to ceremonies or special events.

=== Medicine ===
In recent times, traditional medicine has co-existed with western medicine, with traditional practices more prevalent among followers of the Gaihwi꞉io (Longhouse Religion). People may resort to traditional practices for certain types of ailments, and to western medicine for other types, or they may use both traditional and western medicine to treat the same ailment as a form of double security.

The Haudenosaunee societies are active in maintaining the practice of traditional medicine.

=== Women in society ===
The Haudenosaunee have historically followed a matriarchal system. Men and women have traditionally had separate roles but both hold real power in the Nations. No person is entitled to 'own' land, but it is believed that the Creator appointed women as stewards of the land. Traditionally, the Clan Mothers appoint leaders, as they have raised children and are therefore held to a higher regard. By the same token, if a leader does not prove sound, becomes corrupt or does not listen to the people, the Clan Mothers have the power to strip him of his leadership. The chief of a clan can be removed at any time by a council of the women elders of that clan. The chief's sister has historically been responsible for nominating his successor. The clan mothers, the elder women of each clan, are highly respected.

Haudenosaunee kinship is matrilineal, and hereditary leadership passes through the female line of descent, that is, from a mother to her children. The children of a traditional marriage belong to their mother's clan and gain their social status through hers. Her brothers are important teachers and mentors to the children, especially introducing boys to men's roles and societies. If a couple separates, the woman traditionally keeps the children. It is regarded as incest by the Haudenosaunee to marry within one's matrilineal clan, but considered acceptable to marry someone from the same patrilineal clan.

Historically women held the dwellings, horses and farmed land, and a woman's property before marriage has stayed in her possession without being mixed with that of her husband. The work of a woman's hands is hers to do with as she sees fit. At marriage, a young couple lived in the longhouse of the wife's family (matrilocality). A woman choosing to divorce a shiftless or otherwise unsatisfactory husband is able to ask him to leave the dwelling and take his possessions with him.

Several other factors influenced the position of Haudenosaunee women. The exhaustion of the beavers' population led to men traveling for longer distances; this resulted in women having a more influential role in their societies because of the long absence of men. Another factor that influenced women's position shift was the reorganization of the political structure. The changes were influential as elected representatives instead of women-appointed chiefs.

The teachings of Handsome Lake also expanded to influence the wider Haudenosaunee society. The power centered around the mode of food production and the social sphere in general. Handsome Lake's teaching tried to center the nuclear family and transferred the women's sphere to be relegated to the home while the men's sphere focused on horticulture. Also, the Handsome Lake code shifted from the family structure from the maternal one to one that centers around the patriarch.

The status of Haudenosaunee women inspired and had an impact on the early American Feminist movement. This was seen in the Seneca Falls Convention of 1848, the first feminist convention. For example, Matilda Gage, a prominent member of the convention, wrote extensively about the Haudenosaunee throughout her life. Elizabeth Cady lived in close proximity to the Seneca nation of the Haudenosaunee and had a relative and a neighbor who was adopted by the Seneca.

=== Spiritual beliefs ===
Like many cultures, the Haudenosaunee's spiritual beliefs changed over time and varied across the constituent nations. Generally, the Haudenosaunee believed in numerous deities, including the Creator or Great Spirit, the Thunderer, and the Three Sisters (the spirits of beans, maize, and squash). The Great Spirit was thought to have created plants, animals, and humans to control "the forces of good in nature", and to guide ordinary people. Orenda is the proposed Iroquoian name for the magical potence found in people and their environment. The Haudenosaunee are argued to have believed in the orenda, the spiritual force that flowed through all things, and believed if people were respectful of nature, then the orenda would be harnessed to bring about positive results. There were three types of spirits for the Haudenosaunee: 1) Those living on the earth 2) Those living above the earth and 3) the highest level of spirits controlling the universe from high above with the highest of those beings known variously as the Great Spirit, the Great Creator or the Master of Life.

Sources provide different stories about Haudenosaunee creation beliefs. Brascoupé and Etmanskie focus on the first person to walk the earth, called Sky Woman or Aientsik. Aientsik's daughter Tekawerahkwa gave birth to twins, Tawiskaron, who created vicious animals and river rapids, while Okwiraseh created "all that is pure and beautiful". After a battle where Okwiraseh defeated Tawiskaron, Tawiskaron was confined to "the dark areas of the world", where he governed the night and destructive creatures. Other scholars present the "twins" as the Creator and his brother, Flint. The Creator was responsible for game animals, while Flint created predators and disease. Saraydar (1990) suggests the Haudenosaunee do not see the twins as polar opposites but understood their relationship to be more complex, noting "Perfection is not to be found in gods or humans or the worlds they inhabit."

Haudenosaunee spiritual history consistently refer to dark times of terror and misery prior to the Haudenosaunee Confederacy, ended by the arrival of the Great Peacemaker. Tradition asserts that the Peacemaker demonstrated his authority as the Creator's messenger by climbing a tall tree above a waterfall, having the people cut down the tree, and reappearing the next morning unharmed. Along with Jigonhsasee, the Peacemaker restored mental health to a few of the most "violent and dangerous men", Hiawatha and Tadodaho, who then helped him bear the message of peace to others..

After the arrival of the Europeans, some Haudenosaunee became Christians, among them the first Native American Saint, Kateri Tekakwitha, a young woman of Mohawk-Algonquin parents. The Seneca chief Handsome Lake, also known as Ganeodiyo, introduced a new religious system to the Haudenosaunee in the late 18th century, which incorporated Quaker beliefs along with traditional Iroquoian culture. Handsome Lake's teachings include a focus on parenting, appreciation of life, and peace. A key aspect of Handsome Lake's teachings is the principle of equilibrium, wherein each person's talents combined into a functional community. By the 1960s, at least 50% of Haudenosaunee followed this religion.

Dreams play a significant role in Haudenosaunee spirituality, providing information about a person's desires and prompting individuals to fulfill dreams. To communicate upward, humans can send prayers to spirits by burning tobacco.

Condolence ceremonies are conducted by the Haudenosaunee for both ordinary and important people, but most notably when a royaner (chief) died. Such ceremonies were still held on Haudenosaunee reservations as late as the 1970s. After death, the soul is thought to embark on a journey, undergo a series of ordeals, and arrive in the sky world. This journey is thought to take one year, during which the Haudenosaunee mourn for the dead. After the mourning period, a feast is held to celebrate the soul's arrival in the skyworld.

Faithkeepers are part-time specialists who conduct religious ceremonies. Both men and women can be appointed as Faithkeepers by Haudenosaunee elders.

==== Thanksgiving address ====
The Haudenosaunee thanksgiving address (Note: Mohawk: Ohèn:ton Karihwatéhkwen; Oneida: Kanuhelatúksla; Onondaga: Ganoñhéñ·nyoñ’ or Ganǫhę́·nyǫ’; Cayuga: Ganǫ́hǫnyǫhk; Seneca: Ganö̀:nyök) is a central prayer in Haudenosaunee tradition recited daily in the beginning of school days as well as social, cultural, and political events. The address gives thanks to the parts of nature necessary to ecosystem sustainability and emphasizes the ideology that all animals and plants within an ecosystem are connected and each plays a vital role in it.

The phrasing of the address may vary depending on the speaker but is usually composed of 17 main sections and ends with a closing prayer. The 17 main sections are: 1) The people, 2) The Earth Mother, 3) The waters, 4) The fish, 5) plants, 6) food plants,7) medicine herbs, 8) animals, 9) trees, 10) birds, 11) four winds, 12) The Thunderers, 13) The Sun, 14) Grandmother Moon, 15) The stars, 16) The Enlightened Teachers, and 17) The Creator. Within each section, gratitude is given for the gifts that section provides to humanity.

The address serves as a pledge of gratitude as well as a "scientific inventory of the natural world". By describing living and non-living elements of the ecosystem and their functions, uses and benefits, the pledge instills early concepts of traditional ecological knowledge within grade school children and onward.

After asking permission from Oren Lyons, a Faithkeeper of the Onondaga Nation, Robin Wall Kimmerer included the Haudenosaunee thanksgiving address in her book Braiding Sweetgrass: Indigenous Wisdom, Scientific Knowledge, and the Teachings of Plants.

==== Societies ====
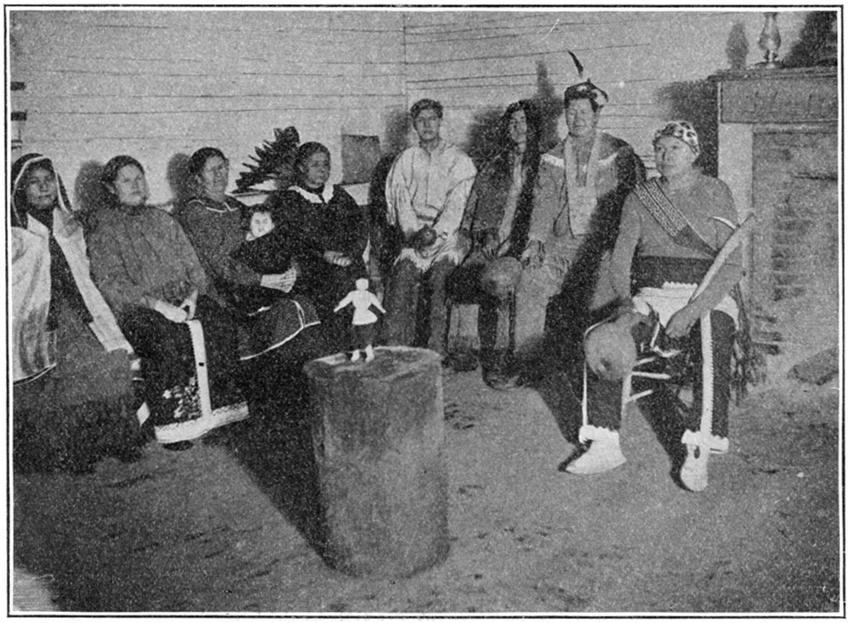
Meeting of the Society of Mystic Animals c.1900

Fraternal societies, often called "medicine societies", "medicine lodges", or "curing societies", played an important role in Haudenosaunee social organization. Lewis H. Morgan says that each society "was a brotherhood into which new members were admitted by formal initiation." Originally the membership seems to have been on the basis of moiety (the matrilineal division within each clan), but by 1909 all societies seem to have been open to all men regardless of kinship.

It is believed that "most of the societies are of ancient origin and that their rituals have been transmitted with little change for many years." "Each society has a legend by which its origin and peculiar rites are explained." As part of his religious revolution, Handsome Lake "sought to destroy the societies and orders that conserved the older religious rites." A council of chiefs proclaimed, some time around 1800, that all animal and mystery societies should immediately dissolve, but through a defect in the form of the order the societies decided it was not legally binding and "went underground" becoming secret societies. Condemned by the Code of Handsome Lake, the societies were also rejected by the Christian Haudenosaunee as holding pagan beliefs. Gradually, however, the societies came more into the open as hostility lessened.

A number of societies are known, of which the False Face Society is the most familiar. Others include the Little Water Society, the Pygmy Society, the Society of Otters, the Society of Mystic Animals, the Eagle Society, the Bear Society, the Buffalo Society, the Husk Faces, and the Woman's Society—which despite its name had male membership. The Sisters of the Deo-ha-ko was an organization of women.

During healing ceremonies, a carved "False Face Mask" is worn to represent spirits in a tobacco-burning and prayer ritual. False Face Masks are carved in living trees, then cut free to be painted and decorated. False Faces represent grandfathers of the Haudenosaunee, and are thought to reconnect humans and nature and to frighten illness-causing spirits.

The Haudenosaunee today have several different medicine societies. The False Face Company conducts rituals to cure sick people by driving away spirits; the Husk Face Society is made up of those who had dreams seen as messages from the spirits and the Secret Medicine Society likewise conducts rituals to cure the sick. There are 12 different types of masks worn by the societies. The types of masks are:

- The Secret Society of Medicine Men and the Company of Mystic Animals:
  - Divided mask that painted half black and half red;
  - Masks with exaggerated long noses;
  - Horn masks;
  - Blind masks without eye sockets.
- Husk Face Society:
  - Masks made of braided corn.
- False Face Society:
  - Whistling masks;
  - Masks with smiling faces;
  - Masks with protruding tongues;
  - Masks with exaggerated hanging mouths;
  - Masks with exaggerated straight lops;
  - Masks with spoon-lips;
  - Masks with a disfigured twisted mouth.

The "crooked face" masks with the twisted mouths, the masks with the spoon lips and the whistling masks are the "Doctor" masks. The other masks are "Common Face" or "Beggar" masks that are worn by those who help the Doctors.

The Husk Face Society performs rituals to communicate with the spirits in nature to ensure a good crop, the False Face Society performs rituals to chase away evil spirits, and the Secret Medicine Society performs rituals to cure diseases. The grotesque masks represent the faces of the spirits that the dancers are attempting to please. Those wearing Doctor masks blow hot ashes into the faces of the sick to chase away the evil spirits that are believed to be causing the illness. The masked dancers often carried turtle shell rattles and long staffs.

==== Festivals ====
The Haudenosaunee traditionally celebrate several major festivals throughout the year. These usually combine a spiritual component and ceremony, a feast, a chance to celebrate together, sports, entertainment and dancing. These celebrations have historically been oriented to the seasons and celebrated based on the cycle of nature rather than fixed calendar dates.

For instance, the Mid-winter festival, Gi'-ye-wä-no-us-quä-go-wä ("The supreme belief") ushers in the new year. This festival is traditionally held for one week around the end of January to early February, depending on when the new moon first occurs that year.

Haudenosaunee ceremonies are primarily concerned with farming, healing, and thanksgiving. Key festivals correspond to the agricultural calendar, and include Maple, Planting, Strawberry, Green Maize, Harvest, and Mid-Winter (or New Year's), which is held in early February. The ceremonies were given by the Creator to the Haudenosaunee to balance good with evil. In the 17th century, Europeans described the Haudenosaunee as having 17 festivals, but only 8 are observed today. The most important of the ceremonies were the New Year Festival, the Maple Festival held in late March to celebrate spring, the Sun Shooting Festival which also celebrates spring, the Seed Dance in May to celebrate the planting of the crops, the Strawberry Festival in June to celebrate the ripening of the strawberries, the Thunder Ceremony to bring rain in July, the Green Bean Festival in early August, the Green Corn Festival in late August and the Harvest Festival in October. Of all the festivals, the most important were the Green Corn Festival to celebrate the maturing of the corn and the New Year Festival. During all of the festivals, men and women from the False Face Society, the Medicine Society and the Husk Face Society dance wearing their masks in attempt to humor the spirits that controlled nature.

The most important of the occasions for the masked dancers to appear were the New Year Festival, which was felt to be an auspicious occasion to chase the malevolent spirits that were believed to cause disease. An important ritual in the New Year Festival was the White Dog Sacrifice. During this ritual a pure white dog would be strangled before being decorated with ribbons, spots of red paint, and a collar of wampum. The dog would then be hung up on a long pole for a few days. Afterwards, it would be taken down and thrown in a fire with tobacco while speeches were read. The White Dog Sacrifice may have had varying religious significance among the nations of the Haudenosaunee, with the Seneca viewing the ritual as sending the dog to the Great Creator as a messenger.

=== Art ===
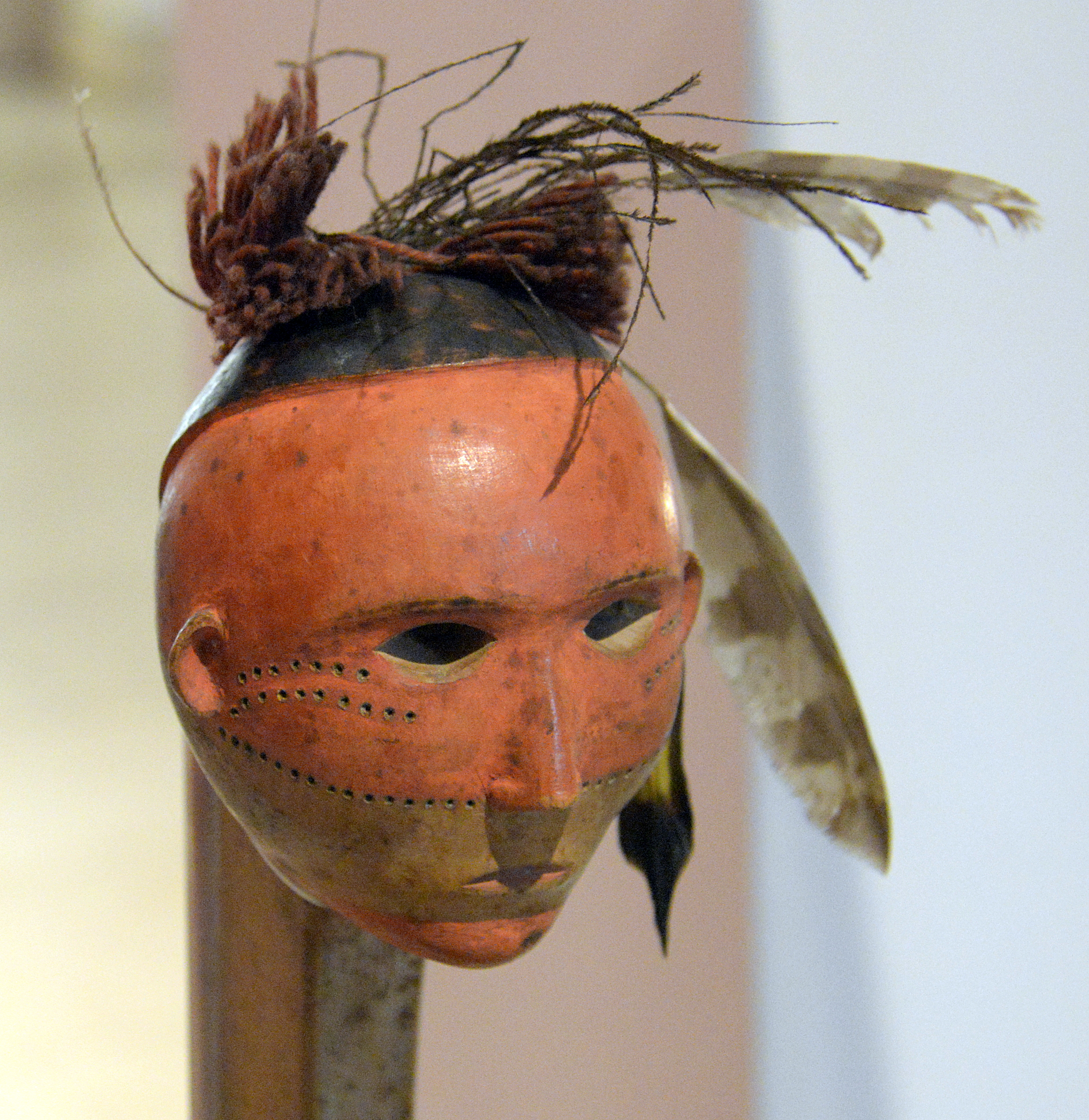
Detail. Ball-headed club. A diplomatic gift to James Bruce (8th Earl Elgin and 12th Earl of Kincardine), made most probably by Haudenosaunee. From Canada, early-mid 19th century CE. National Museum of Scotland

Haudenosaunee art includes a wide range of visual forms, including wood carving, pottery, quillwork, beadwork, basketry, husk work, silverwork, clothing, jewelry, and wampum. Historically, Haudenosaunee artists used animal, human, and geometric imagery on wood, bowls, pottery, and clay pipes, while later beadwork and related arts often featured floral designs. In the 19th century, the Haudenosaunee Realist School adapted Haudenosaunee subjects and stories to watercolor and other flat media, and in the 20th and 21st centuries Haudenosaunee artists worked across painting, sculpture, assemblage, video, and site-specific installation. Modern Haudenosaunee art often addresses history, colonialism, cultural continuity, innovation, and resilience.

The work of Caroline G. Parker (Jigonhsasee), a 19th century embroiderer and bead-worker of the Seneca Wolf Clan, has had a lasting influence on Seneca and Tuscarora fashion. She combined elements of both Haudenosaunee and Victorian styles to her art.

=== Lacrosse ===
The modern version of lacrosse is popular among the Haudenosaunee, who have a long history with the sport.

The First Nations Lacrosse Association is recognized by World Lacrosse as a sovereign state for international lacrosse competitions. It is the only sport in which the Haudenosaunee field national teams and the only Indigenous people's organization sanctioned for international competition by any world sporting governing body.

=== Naming conventions ===
Each clan has a group of personal names which may be used to name members. The clan mother is responsible for keeping track of those names not in use, which may then be reused to name infants. When a child becomes an adult he takes a new "adult" name in place of his "baby" name. Some names are reserved for chiefs or faith keepers, and when a person assumes that office he takes the name in a ceremony in which he is considered to "resuscitate" the previous holder. If a chief resigns or is removed he gives up the name and resumes his previous one.

== Government ==
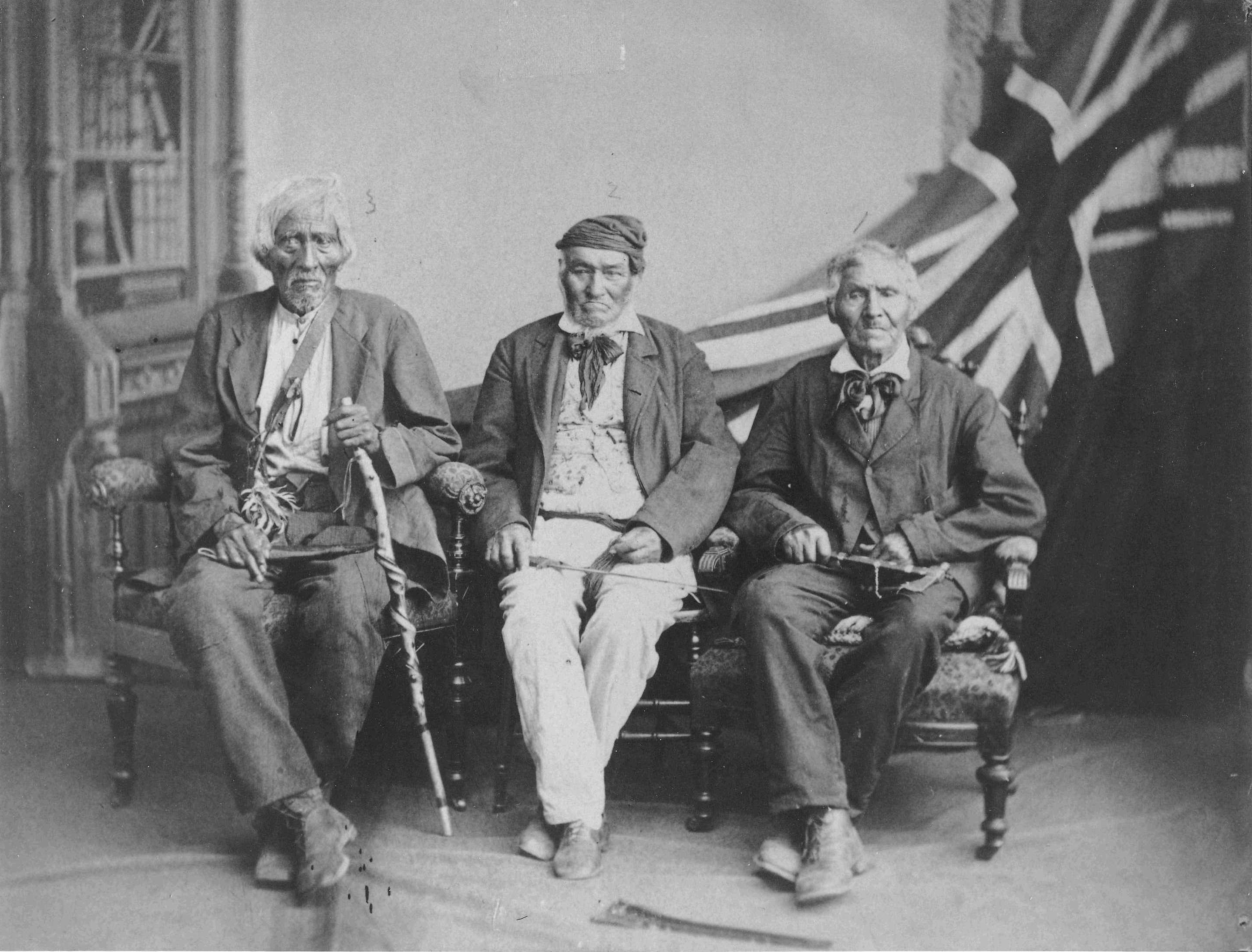
Mohawk leader John Smoke Johnson (left) with John Tutela and Young Warner, two other Six Nations War of 1812 veterans, in July 1882

The Grand Council of the Six Nations is an assembly of 56 Hoyenah (chiefs). Chief offices are hereditary within their clan. When a position becomes vacant a candidate is selected from among the members of the clan and "raised up" by a council of all chiefs. The new chief gives up his old name and is thereafter addressed by the title.

Today, the seats on the Council are distributed among the Six Nations as follows:

- 14 Onondaga
- 10 Cayuga
- 9 Oneida
- 9 Mohawk
- 8 Seneca
- 6 Tuscarora

When anthropologist Lewis Henry Morgan studied the Grand Council in the 19th century, he interpreted it as a central government. This interpretation became influential, but Richter argues that while the Grand Council served an important ceremonial role, it was not a government in the sense that Morgan thought. According to this view, Haudenosaunee political and diplomatic decisions are made on the local level and are based on assessments of community consensus. A central government that develops policy and implements it for the people at large is not the Haudenosaunee model of government.

Unanimity in public acts was essential to the Council. In 1855, Minnie Myrtle observed that no Haudenosaunee treaty was binding unless it was ratified by 75% of the male voters and 75% of the mothers of the nation. In revising Council laws and customs, a consent of two-thirds of the mothers was required. The need for a double supermajority to make major changes made the Confederacy a de facto consensus government.

The women traditionally held real power, particularly the power to veto treaties or declarations of war. The members of the Grand Council of Chiefs were chosen by the mothers of each clan. If any leader failed to comply with the wishes of the women of his nation and the Great Law of Peace, the mother of his clan could demote him, a process called "dehorning". The deer antlers, an emblem of leadership, were removed from his headgear, thus returning him to private life.

Councils of the mothers of each nation were held separately from the men's councils. The women used men as runners to send word of their decisions to concerned parties, or a woman could appear at the men's council as an orator, presenting the view of the women. Women often took the initiative in suggesting legislation.

=== Wampum belts ===
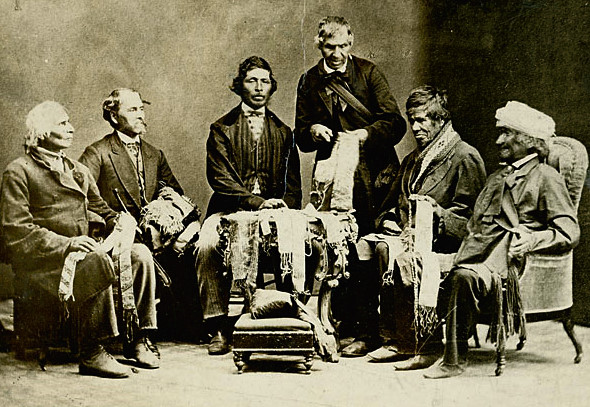
Chiefs of the Six Nations explaining their wampum belts to Horatio Hale, 1871

The term "wampum" refers to beads made from purple and white mollusk shells on threads of elm bark. Species used to make wampum include the highly prized quahog clam which produces the famous purple colored beads. For white colored beads the shells from the channeled whelk, knobbed whelk, lightning whelk, and snow whelk are used.

Wampum was primarily used to make wampum belts by the Haudenosaunee, which Haudenosaunee tradition claims was invented by Hiawatha to console chiefs and clan mothers who lost family members to war. Wampum belts played a major role in the Condolence Ceremony and in the raising of new chiefs. Both chiefs and clan mothers wear wampum belts as symbol of their offices. Wampum belts are also used to signify the importance of a specific message being presented. Treaty making often involved wampum belts to signify the importance of the treaty.

The Hiawatha Belt

The Hiawatha Belt is the national belt of the Haudenosaunee and is represented in the Haudenosaunee Confederacy flag. The belt has four squares and a tree in the middle which represents the original Five Nations of the Haudenosaunee that were united by the Peacemaker and Hiawatha. Going from left to right the squares represent the Seneca, Cayuga, Oneida and Mohawk. The Onondaga are represented by an eastern white pine which represents the Tree of Peace, an Eastern White Pine, the needles of which are clustered in groups of five. Traditionally the Onondaga are the peace keepers of the confederacy. The placement of the nations on the belt represents the actual geographical distribution of the six nations over their shared territory, with the Seneca in the far west and the Mohawk in the far east of Haudenosaunee territory. The Haudenosaunee flag created in the 1980s is based on the Hiawatha Belt ... created from purple and white wampum beads centuries ago to symbolize the union forged when the former enemies buried their weapons under the Great Tree of Peace."

Treaty belts were later presented to symbolically represent treaties between the Haudenosaunee and European colonists. The Two Row Wampum was originally presented to the Dutch settlers, and then French, with two lines representing a canoe and a sailboat moving side-by-side along the river of life, not interfering with the other's course. All non-Native settlers are, by associations, members of this treaty.

"The Covenant Belt" was presented to the Haudenosaunee at the signing of the Canandaigua Treaty. The belt has a design of thirteen human figures representing symbolically the Thirteen Colonies of the U.S. The house and the two figures directly next to the house represent the Haudenosaunee people and the symbolic longhouse. The figure on the left of the house represent the Seneca Nation who are the symbolic guardians of the western door (western edge of Haudenosaunee territory) and the figure to the right of the house represents the Mohawk who are the keepers of the eastern door (eastern edge of Haudenosaunee territory).

=== Influence on the United States ===
Historians in the 20th century have suggested the Haudenosaunee system of government influenced the development of the U.S. government, although the extent and nature of this influence has been disputed. Bruce Johansen proposes that the Haudenosaunee had a representative form of government.

Consensus has not been reached on how influential the Haudenosaunee model was to the development of U.S. documents such as the Articles of Confederation and the U.S. Constitution. The influence thesis has been discussed by historians such as Donald Grinde and Bruce Johansen. In 1987, Cornell University held a conference on the link between the Haudenosaunee's government and the U.S. Constitution. In 1988, the U.S. Congress passed a resolution to recognize the influence of the Haudenosaunee League upon the Constitution and Bill of Rights.

Scholars such as Jack N. Rakove challenge this thesis. Stanford University historian Rakove writes, "The voluminous records we have for the constitutional debates of the late 1780s contain no significant references to the Iroquois" and notes that there are ample European precedents to the democratic institutions of the U.S. In reply, journalist Charles C. Mann wrote that while he agreed that the specific form of government created for the U.S. was "not at all like" that of the Haudenosaunee, available evidence does support "a cultural argument – that the well-known democratic spirit had much to do with colonial contact with the Indians of the eastern seaboard, including and especially the Haudenosaunee," and (quoting Rakove) "that prolonged contact between the aboriginal and colonizing populations were important elements [sic] in the shaping of colonial society and culture." Historian Francis Jennings noted that supporters of the thesis frequently cite the following statement by Benjamin Franklin, made in a letter from Benjamin Franklin to James Parker in 1751: "It would be a very strange thing, if six Nations of ignorant savages should be capable of forming a Scheme for such a Union ... and yet that a like union should be impracticable for ten or a Dozen English Colonies," but he disagrees that it establishes influence. Rather, he thinks Franklin was promoting union against the "ignorant savages" and called the idea "absurd".

The anthropologist Dean Snow has stated that although Franklin's Albany Plan may have drawn inspiration from the Haudenosaunee League, there is little evidence that either the Plan or the Constitution drew substantially from that source. He argues that "such claims muddle and denigrate the subtle and remarkable features of Haudenosaunee government. The two forms of government are distinctive and individually remarkable in conception."

Similarly, the anthropologist Elisabeth Tooker has concluded that "there is virtually no evidence that the framers borrowed from the Iroquois." She argues that the idea is a myth resulting from a claim made by linguist and ethnographer J.N.B. Hewitt that was exaggerated and misunderstood after his death in 1937. According to Tooker, the original Haudenosaunee constitution did not involve representative democracy and elections; deceased chiefs' successors were selected by the most senior woman within the hereditary lineage in consultation with other women in the tribe.

=== International relations ===
==== Relations with colonial powers ====
The Haudenosaunee people, living mainly in present-day New York and Pennsylvania, had many encounters with European colonial powers, primarily the English, Dutch, and French.

The Dutch respected Haudenosaunee land claims and were peaceful with the Haudenosaunee, specifically the Mohawk people. Trying to avoid their own Black Legend, the Dutch established trade and an allyship with the Mohawk people. By the 1640s Dutch traders were exporting thousands of furs a year, most of which were traded from the Mohawks. The Mohawks used their monopoly over the Fort Orange (Albany) market to set prices. Many of the furs the Mohawks sold were stolen from other Indigenous enemies around the St Lawrence River region and then traded to the Dutch. While the Dutch had strong relations with the Mohawks, they fell into conflict with other Indigenous peoples like the Delawares.

Initially, English rule around the Haudenosaunee strengthened their position. In the mid-1670s, New York governor Sir Edmund Andros allied with the Haudenosaunee in what was known as the Covenant Chain. During the Covenant Chain, the English and Haudenosaunee reinforced each other. The English and Haudenosaunee would join to fight Native rivals and the French. Andros accepted the Haudenosaunee land claim in the vast area stretching to the Ohio River. Starting in the 1680s, natives around the Great Lakes and Ohio Valley would regroup and with French aid pushed the Haudenosaunee back east. The Haudenosaunee would continue to support the English during the Seven Years' War from 1754 to 1763. English respect of Haudenosaunee land claims was starting to diminish and by the end of the 18th century, the Haudenosaunee would adopt a policy of neutrality with the European empires while continuing to profit off the fur trade.

==== 20th century to present ====
The Grand Council of the Haudenosaunee Confederacy declared war on Germany in 1917 during World War I and again in 1942 in World War II.

The Haudenosaunee government has issued passports since 1923, when Haudenosaunee authorities issued a passport to Cayuga statesman Deskaheh (Levi General) to travel to the League of Nations headquarters.

More recently, passports have been issued since 1997. Before 2001 these were accepted by various nations for international travel, but with increased security concerns across the world since the September 11 attacks, this is no longer the case. In 2010, the Haudenosaunee Nationals lacrosse team was allowed by the U.S. to travel on their own passports to the 2010 World Lacrosse Championship in England only after the personal intervention of Secretary of State Hillary Clinton. However, the British government refused to recognize the Haudenosaunee passports and denied the team members entry into the United Kingdom.

The Onondaga Nation spent $1.5 million on an upgrade to the passports designed to meet 21st-century international security requirements.

== People ==
Iroquois Haudenosaunee

Total population
- 125,000 (2010, est.)

Regions with significant populations
- North America
- United States: 80,000
- Canada: 45,000

Languages
- Northern Iroquoian languages (including Mohawk, Oneida, Onondaga, Cayuga, Seneca, Tuscarora), English, French

Religion
- Longhouse Religion, Karihwiio, Kanoh'hon'io, Kahni'kwi'io, Christianity, others

=== Nations ===
The first five nations listed below formed the original Five Nations (listed from east to west, as they were oriented to the sunrise); the Tuscarora became the sixth nation in 1722.

English name	Iroquoian name	Meaning	17th/18th-century location
Mohawk	Kanienʼkehá꞉ka	"People of the Great Flint"	Mohawk River
Oneida	Onʌyotaʼá꞉ka	"People of the Standing Stone"	Oneida Lake
Onondaga	Onoñdaʼgegáʼ	"People of the Hills"	Onondaga Lake
Cayuga	Gayogo̱hó꞉nǫˀ	"People of the Great Swamp"	Cayuga Lake
Seneca	Onödowaʼga꞉ʼ	"People of the Great Hill"	Seneca Lake and Genesee River
Tuscarora^{1}	Skarù·ręʔ	"Hemp Gatherers"	From North Carolina^{2}
1 Not one of the original Five Nations; joined 1722. 2 Settled between the Oneida and Onondaga.

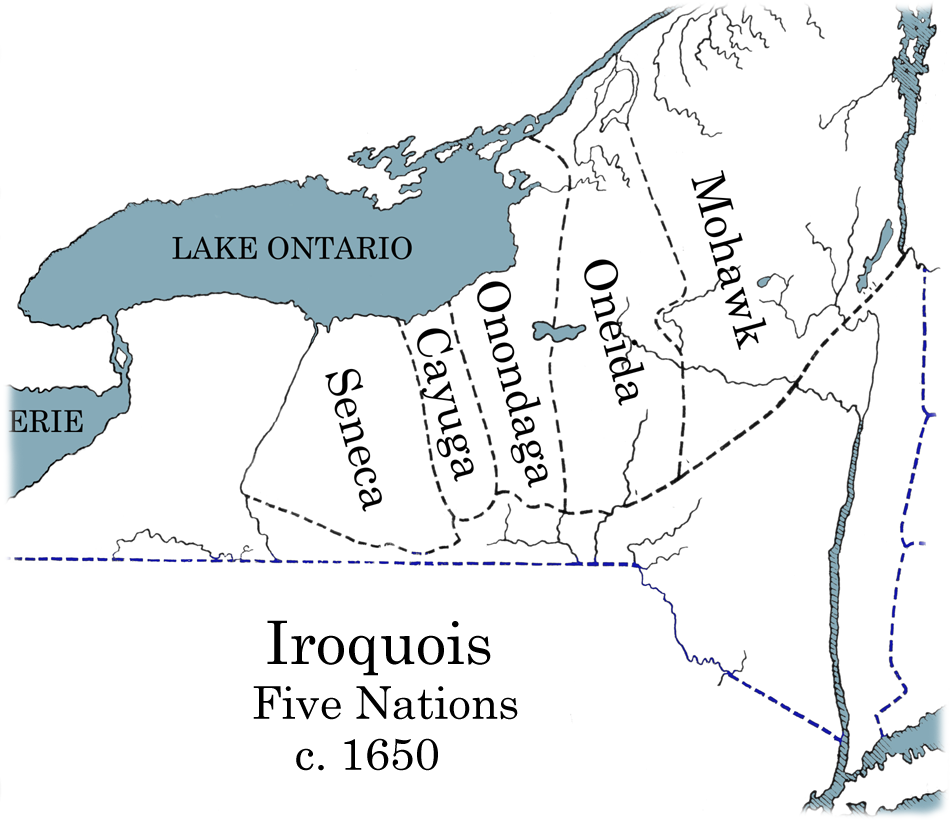
Iroquois Five Nations c. 1650

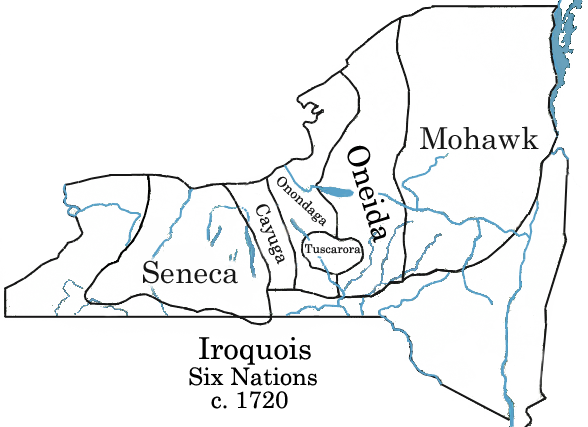
Iroquois Six Nations c. 1720

=== Population history ===
Modern scholarly estimates of the 17th century population of the Haudenosaunee have ranged from 5,500 to more than 100,000. When it comes to eye-witness estimates (that is, contemporary estimates) Marc Lescarbot estimated the Haudenosaunee in year 1609 at 8,000 warriors (that is around 40,000 people) and baron L. A. de Lahontan estimated the Haudenosaunee population around year 1690 at 70,000 people (on average 14,000 in each of five nations). Haudenosaunee territory in the 16th century and at the beginning of the 17th century was over 75,000 square km (over 29,000 square mi). John R. Swanton enumerated a total of 226 Haudenosaunee villages and towns (but most were not occupied at the same time as the Haudenosaunee moved villages every five to twenty years). On the contrary Lewis H. Morgan in his 1851 book estimated the Haudenosaunee population in 1650 at 25,000 people, including 10,000 Seneca, 5,000 Mohawk, 4,000 Onondaga, 3,000 Oneida and 3,000 Cayuga. The Seneca were also estimated at 13,000 in year 1672 and 15,000 in year 1687. In 1713–1722, the Haudenosaunee population was augmented when the Tuscarora migrated north to New York and joined them as the sixth nation.

More recent estimates by Snow and Jones of the Haudenosaunee population have been about 20,000. Jones' estimate applies to the period preceding the first known epidemics of Old World diseases impacting the Haudenosaunee in the mid-17th century. After an archaeological investigation and dating of all 125 Haudenosaunee villages known to have been occupied between 1500 and 1700 (fewer than 226 listed by Swanton occupied at any time), Jones estimated the total pre-epidemic Haudenosaunee population at 20,000 in 1620–1634. In the post-epidemic period from 1634 to 1660 he estimates the total Haudenosaunee population at 8,000. The latter figure does not include the thousands of people adopted into the Haudenosaunee from conquered ethnic groups. The Haudenosaunee had a liberal and successful adoption policy that allowed them to recoup their population losses and gave them an adaptive advantage over their foes who were unable to do the same. In 1658, the Jesuits noted that the Haudenosaunee contained more adopted foreigners than natives of the country.

In 1779 between 40 and 60 Haudenosaunee towns and villages were destroyed by the Sullivan Expedition in a scorched earth operation. More than 5,000 Haudenosaunee fled to British Canada and an unknown number remained in the U.S. According to one estimate 4,500 died in the aftermath of the expedition, including many who fled to Canada.

In 1907 there were 17,630 Haudenosaunee and in 1923 there were 8,696 Haudenosaunee in the USA and 11,355 in Canada, for a total of 20,051.

According to data compiled in 1995 by Doug George-Kanentiio, a total of 51,255 Six Nations people lived in Canada. These included 15,631 Mohawk in Quebec; 14,051 Mohawk in Ontario; 3,970 Oneida in Ontario; and a total of 17,603 of the Six Nations at the Grand River Reserve in Ontario. More recently according to the Six Nations Elected Council, some 12,436 on the Six Nations of the Grand River reserve, the largest First Nations reserve in Canada, as of December 2014 and 26,034 total in Canada.

In 1995, tribal registrations among the Six Nations in the U.S. numbered about 30,000 in total, with the majority of 17,566 in New York. The remainder were more than 10,000 Oneida in Wisconsin, and about 2200 Seneca-Cayuga in Oklahoma. As the nations individually determine their rules for membership or citizenship, they report the official numbers. (Some traditional members of the nations refuse to be counted.) There is no federally recognized Haudenosaunee nation or tribe, nor are any Native Americans enrolled as Haudenosaunee.

In the 2000 U.S. census, 80,822 people identified as having Haudenosaunee ethnicity, with 45,217 claiming only Haudenosaunee ancestry. There are multiple reservations in New York: Cayuga Nation of New York(~450,) St. Regis Mohawk Reservation (3,288), Onondaga Reservation (468), Oneida Indian Nation (~ 1000), Seneca Nation of New York (533) and the Tuscarora Reservation (1,138 in 2000). Some 21,000 lived at the Oneida Nation of Wisconsin, according to the 2000 census. Seneca-Cayuga Nation in Oklahoma has more than 5,000 people in 2011. In the 2010 census, 81,002 persons identified as Haudenosaunee, and 40,570 as Haudenosaunee only across the U.S. Including the Haudenosaunee in Canada, the total population numbered over 125,000 as of 2009.

In the 2020 U.S. census in total 113,814 people identified as Haudenosaunee.

=== Modern communities ===
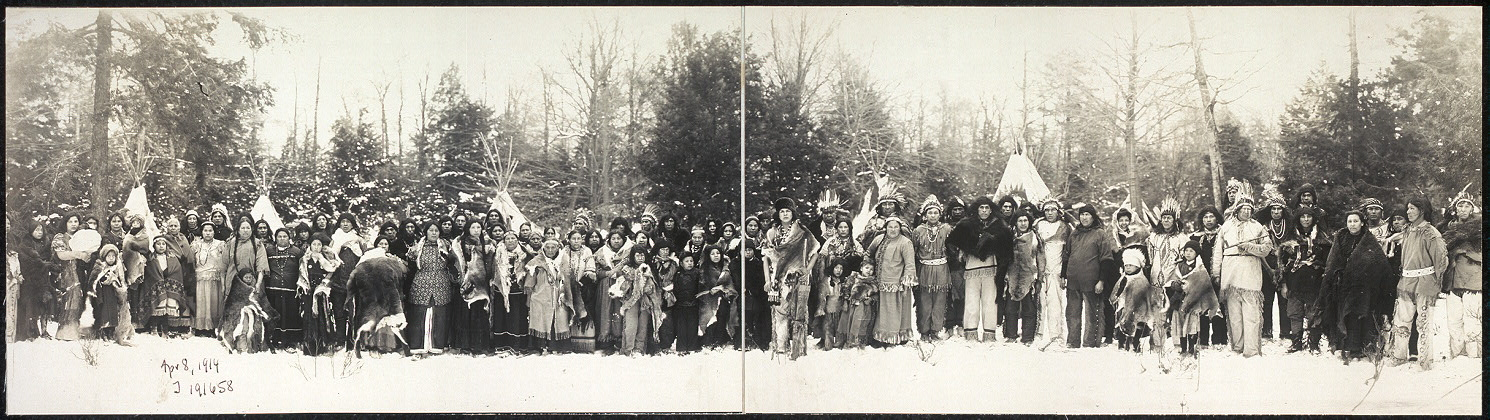
Haudenosaunee in Buffalo, New York, 1914

Several communities exist of people descended from the nations of the Haudenosaunee Confederacy.

Recognized lands of modern Haudenosaunee communities

==== Canada ====
- Kahnawake Mohawk in Quebec
- Kanesatake Mohawk in Quebec
- Mohawk Nation of Akwesasne in Ontario and Quebec
- Oneida Nation of the Thames in Ontario
- Six Nations of the Grand River Territory in Ontario
- Tyendinaga Mohawk Territory in Ontario
- Wahta Mohawk Territory in Ontario

==== United States ====
- Cayuga Nation in New York
- Ganienkeh Mohawk in New York – not federally recognized
- Kanatsiohareke Mohawk in New York – not federally recognized
- Onondaga Nation in New York
- Oneida Indian Nation in New York
- Oneida Nation in Wisconsin
- St. Regis Mohawk Tribe in New York
- Seneca Nation in New York
- Seneca–Cayuga Nation in Oklahoma
- Tonawanda Seneca Nation of New York
- Tuscarora Nation of New York

== See also ==
- Wabanaki Confederacy
- Covenant Chain
- David Cusick
- Economy of the Haudenosaunee
- Ely S. Parker
- First Nations Lacrosse Association
- Flying Head
- Ganondagan State Historic Site
- Gideon Hawley
- Great Law of Peace
- Handsome Lake
- Haudenosaunee art
- Haudenosaunee music
- Haudenosaunee mythology
- Haudenosaunee settlement of the north shore of Lake Ontario
- History of New York (state)
- History of Ontario
- Iroquoian languages
- Iroquois White Corn Project
- Kahnawake Iroquois and the Rebellions of 1837–38
- Lake Ontario National Marine Sanctuary
- Lenape
- Mohawk Chapel
- Proto-Iroquoian language
- Red Jacket
- Saint Lawrence Iroquoians
- Seven Nations of Canada
- Sir William Johnson, 1st Baronet
- Six Nations of the Grand River
- Sketches of the Ancient History of the Six Nations
- Sullivan Expedition
- Town Destroyer
- Urban Indian
- Wendat Confederacy

== Bibliography ==
- Brascoupé, Simon; Etmanskie, Jenny (2006). "Iroquois". In Birx, James (ed.). Encyclopedia of Anthropology. Thousand Oaks, CA: Sage Publications. pp. 1328–1333. doi:10.4135/9781412952453.n483. ISBN 9780761930297.
- Charlton, Thomas (1968). "On Iroquois Incest". Anthropologica. 10 (1): 29–43. doi:10.2307/25604757. JSTOR 25604757.
- Chartrand, René (2007). The Canadian Corps in World War I. Oxford: Osprey Publishing.
- Daeg de Mott, D. K. (2009). "Iroquois". In Gall, Timothy L.; Hobby, Jeneen (eds.). Worldmark Encyclopedia of Cultures and Daily Life, Vol. 2 (2nd ed.). Detroit: Gale. pp. 304–310. ISBN 978-1414448909.
- Day, Gordon M. (1968). "Iroquois: An Etymology". Ethnohistory. 15 (4): 389–402. doi:10.2307/480418. JSTOR 480418.
- Fenton, William N. (1998). The Great Law and the Longhouse: A Political History of the Iroquois Confederacy. Norman: University of Oklahoma Press. ISBN 0-8061-3003-2.
- Graymont, Barbara (1972). The Iroquois in the American Revolution (1st Paperback ed.). Syracuse University Press. ISBN 978-0-8156-0116-6.
- Johansen, Bruce Elliott; Mann, Barbara Alice (2000). Encyclopedia of the Haudenosaunee. Greenwood Publishing Group. ISBN 978-0-313-30880-2.
- Johnson, Michael (2003). Tribes of the Iroquois Confederacy. Osprey Publishing. ISBN 978-1-84176-490-0.
- Jones, Eric E. (December 2008). Iroquois Population History and Settlement Ecology, AD 1500–1700. Pennsylvania State University.
- Mann, Charles C. (2005). 1491 New Revelations of the Americas Before Columbus. New York: Alfred A. Knopf. ISBN 978-1-4000-4006-3.
- Morgan, Lewis H. (1904). League of the Ho-dé-no-sau-nee or Iroquois. New York: Dodd, Mead.
- Morgan, Thomas D. (Fall 1995). "Native Americans in World War II". Army History: The Professional Bulletin of Army History (35): 22–27. Archived from the original on March 27, 2017 – via www.shsu.edu.
- Morton, Desmond (1999). A Military History of Canada. Toronto: McClelland & Stewart.
- Philip, Kenneth R. (2002) [1999]. Termination Revisited: American Indians on the Trail to Self-Determination, 1933–1953. Lincoln: University of Nebraska Press. ISBN 0-8032-3723-5.
- Reid, Gerald (1996). "Iroquois". Encyclopedia of World Cultures. Vol. 1: North America. New York: Macmillan Reference USA. pp. 164–167.
- Saraydar, Stephen (1990). "No Longer Shall You Kill: Peace, Power, and the Iroquois Great Law". Anthropology and Humanism Quarterly. 15 (1): 20–28. doi:10.1525/ahu.1990.15.1.20.
- Shannon, Timothy J. (2008). Iroquois Diplomacy on the Early American Frontier. New York: Viking Books. ISBN 978-0-670-01897-0.
- Shattuck, George C. (1991). The Oneida Land Claims: A Legal History. Syracuse University Press. ISBN 9780815625254.
- Trigger, Bruce G., ed. (1978). Handbook of North American Indians. Vol. 15. Washington: Smithsonian Institution.
- Winegard, Timothy C. (2012). For King and Kanata: Canadian Indians and the First World War. Winnipeg: University of Manitoba Press. ISBN 978-0-88755-728-6.
