= John Arthur Gibson =

Seneca chief

Chief or Hoyaneh John Arthur Gibson
- Seneca: Sganyodaiyoʼ
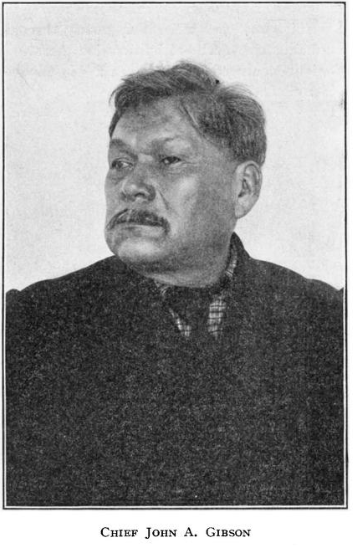
- Seneca Nation Chief John A Gibson (circa 1912), Six Nations of the Grand River
- Born: March 1, 1850; Tuscarora Township, Canada West, Six Nations of the Grand River reserve
- Died: November 1, 1912 (aged 62); Tuscarora Township, Ontario, Six Nations of the Grand River reserve
- Known for: renditions of the Great Law of Peace, 19-20th century lacrosse
- Office: Hoyaneh (Sganyodaiyoʼ)
- Term: 1872-1912
- Spouse: Mary Skye Gibson
- Children: 3

John Arthur Gibson (March 1, 1850 – November 1, 1912) was a Hoyaneh of the Seneca nation of the Haudenosaunee (Iroquois) confederation. Part Onondaga and part Seneca, he resided within the reserve of the Six Nations of the Grand River in Ontario, Canada. Knowledgeable about Haudosaunee culture, he is best known for the versions he provided of the Haudenosaunee oral constitution, the Great Law of Peace. He acted as an advisor to the Canadian Department of Indian Affairs in matters relating both to Haudenosaunee and non-Haudenosaunee indigenous people. He was a well-respected player of the traditional Haudenosaunee sport of lacrosse until he was blinded during a game when he was 31.

== Family and reservation life ==
John Arthur Gibson was also known as Ganio'dai'io' ("Promoter of the Code of Handsome Lake") and Skanyadehehyoh or Skanyadai'iyo (Seneca: Sganyodaiyoʼ), the name given to the traditional Seneca Hoyaneh office of Handsome Lake. His father, also named John Gibson, was an Onondaga Hoyaneh (Note: The Mohawk word Royaner is often used for these chief-offices; another word is sachem. According to Horatio Hale's 1883 discussion with Haudenosaunee and historians, sachem is an Algonquin language word for the position and royaner is the traditional word in Mohawk, and is used far more often sometimes. However the recent Encyclopedia of the Haudenosaunee uses both and sachem much more frequently.)) whose title was Atotarho (or Thatótá•hoˀ). His mother was Hanna Gibson, of the Turtle Clan of the Seneca people.

Gibson had two brothers and two sisters. One of the brothers, George, was also named as a Hoyaneh. The family lived on the Six Nations of the Grand River reserve in Ontario.

=== Historical background ===
The Six Nations of the Grand River reserve was founded through the efforts of Mohawk Joseph Brant some 80 years earlier, following the American Revolution, as a rebirth of the Haudenosaunee or Iroquois Confederacy. The incursion of white people onto the reserve, partly encouraged by Brant, had later threatened the hegemony of the Haudenosaunee over their individual lands. In 1847–8 the decision was taken to partition the land to Haudenosaunee families on the basis of bloodlines, with phases of reacquiring land in cases where marriages, divorces or widowhood had established links to non-Indian family. Orphans were granted assistance from the reserve's council only if they were full-blood Indians. This segmentation process caused division between the Christian-converted, acculturated Haudenosaunee and the conservative, Longhouse-religious parts of Haudenosaunee society, even as it provided a specific reservation for the people of the six nations.

Haudenosaunee society has strong matrilineal associations and families adhere to their mother's clan and nation relationships. Thus, Gibson was raised according to the Code of Handsome Lake of his Seneca mother. The Seneca are, approximately speaking in English, "elder brothers" in the Haudenosaunee confederacy – "elder" specifically in relation to the "junior" Cayuga nation. The other "elder brothers" of the confederacy are the Mohawk nation who on the reserve at the time were more Christianized. They exerted considerable influence in council work; they succeeded in moving the seat of the council to a Mohawk village, appointing the executive – and traditionally Onondaga – "firekeeper" positions to Mohawks, and introducing committee decision processes populated with Mohawks. The official language of the council meetings became Mohawk and the traditional balance of power held equally amongst chiefs from all six nations was overcome. The six individual nations still had their own councils, but the central council felt these national councils were divisive (indeed, in the 1850s the Onondaga council had attempted to take action when the central council couldn't decide; the subsequent response by the Mohawk council caused some angst). Even so, the council felt they needed to defend the council's traditional form in the face of the Canadian government seeking to introduce a more Euro-American democratic system.

Gibson was born into this new context of reduced national councils and a strong central or federated council, with a committee system strongly controlled by Mohawks, and a division between Christianized, acculturated Haudenosaunee and the conservative part of the society.

=== The lacrosse player ===
A biography by his wife (a member of the Cayuga nation), describes Gibson as a "traditional man", vigorous and competitive in his youth, and highlights his involvement in the ball game of lacrosse, the traditional sport of the Haudenosaunee. Mrs Gibson's narrative is "almost wholly occupied with lacrosse" and it reflects the role of lacrosse in the Haudenosaunee society as it was then practiced, albeit with a new capitalist aspect. In Haudenosaunee religious thought, lacrosse is one of the two most essential sacred rites, that took place before coming to this world as we know it. The role of men in Haudenosaunee society had changed from being a military asset in prior generations and defining social prominence by combat to having the battle of the game; the intensity of the game was real and became a locus for the native view of masculinity.

The Gibsons took a lead role in organizing lacrosse events, setting up payments to teams and players and charges to supporters. Gibson also organized the first 12-player Haudenosaunee team and was invited to play against white teams; newspapers carried mention of his lacrosse team.

Gibson's wife's account also highlights that Gibson was not simply a "traditional man", but introduced or demonstrated several innovations. For example, although their marriage was arranged in a traditional sense, it is "easy to see in her narrative that the (traditional) matrilocality was no longer in effect and the nuclear family was well introduced". This change was, however, consistent with the Handsome Lake Code and so not totally foreign to Haudenosaunee culture.

Beyond his involvement in lacrosse, Gibson has been viewed as having a great awareness of and willingness to share Haudenosaunee cultural heritage. William N. Fenton described him as "unquestionably the greatest mind of his generation among the Six Nations...[who] became the greatest living source on Haudenosaunee culture at the turn of the century". Alexander Goldenweiser described Gibson in his youth as "one of those wide-awake, keen-witted Indians... who spend hours and days listening to the stories of the old men and who are not satisfied until they have traced a custom or a belief back to its earliest remembered antecedents".

=== Learned Onondaga ===
Although Haudenosaunee society didn't particularly value a person's patrilineal descent, Gibson had strong ties to his father's Onondaga nation. He inherited land from his father and went on to learn Onondaga language, as well as a suite of narratives and practices from the eldest and most senior Onondaga chief (the records do not specify his name). Whoever this Onondaga chief was he was described as being one of the oldest of all the Onondaga, one who personally remembered the days following the splitting up of the Haudenosaunee nations during the American Revolution. He may have been the same Onondaga traditionalist who was present when the Code of Handsome Lake was established among the Seneca women to be remembered. Gibson's knowledge of Onondaga language and practices was so strong that Gibson's father (the senior Onondaga chief) asked Gibson to take his place for some ceremonies; from then on Gibson always spoke Onondaga in public and was later recorded as having been Onondaga himself, as well as Seneca.

== Seneca chief ==
Traditional Haudenosaunee society has 50 chiefs (Seneca: hoyaneh or Mohawk: royaner) that participate in the governing Council. The chiefs' stations are not hereditary positions; every hoyaneh is appointed by a woman or women whose authority it is to appoint based on a consensus they are charged with finding. Distinctions were made between types of chief: Gibson was not appointed as a "Pine Tree Chief" like John Smoke Johnson or John Norton and others, but his value on grounds of ancestry and his personal achievement in Haudenosaunee society were such that he was appointed to the Seneca chief position as "Skanyadehehyoh" (Seneca: Sganyodaiyoʼ) ("Handsome Lake") in 1872. In the available biographies it is not stated which woman leader with authority to appoint the specific Seneca chieftainship office did so.

In 1876 Gibson was appointed to the memorial committee on the centenary of the death of Joseph Brant.

Around 1880–1882, at the age of 31, he was blinded in a game of lacrosse.

Gibson was observed presenting part of the epic about the Great Peacemaker in 1883.

Gibson assisted the Canadian Department of Indian affairs on Haudenosaunee issues as well as on non-Haudenosaunee native matters. He contributed a significant effort in a land dispute between the Six Nations Reserve and the people the land was originally acquired from, the Mississaugas. He was also a council representative at governmental and historical society meetings.

In 1893 Gibson is noted in the New York Tribune as leading the host or receiving party in a condolence ceremony. It also noted he made a living making lacrosse sticks.

In 1895 Gibson was one of two tasked by the council to revise a list of chiefs kept by the council, a task he was again noted for in 1904.

In 1908 Gibson led the condolence ceremony for naming a new chief.

During this period a wide variety of Haudenosaunee stories had been and were being gathered. Gibson was known to have traveled to Cattaraugus Reservation or Allegany Indian Reservation Haudenosaunee communities to present the Code of Handsome Lake. He was quoted as saying, "Another generation and there will be no custom; still another generation and there will be no memory."

Gibson died in 1912 and is buried in the Onondaga Township Indian Cemetery.

== Three renditions of the Great Law of Peace ==
Haudenosaunee society features the Great Law of Peace, developed by Great Peacemaker as its central organizing system combining law, ritual, history, and religion. Oral presentations of the epic story are made on various special occasions, similar to ritual readings from the Declaration of Independence or the US Constitution, by socially recognized individuals who have the office of "Keeper".

Among the best known "Keepers" of Gibson's era were himself and Seth Newhouse (1842–1921), also known as Da-yo-de-ka-ne. Part Mohawk, part Onondaga, and self-educated in the history and stories of the Haudenosaunee, Newhouse took part in politics on the reserve through the Onondaga national council as a declared "Pine Tree Chief". In 1875, the action that caused Mohawk condemnation of the Onondaga national council also brought into question Newhouse's status as a chief. Regardless, Newhouse presented versions of the epic in the 1880s, hoping first that it would be written into Canadian law, and then recognized by the confederacy's central council. Newhouse also participated in a process of defining exactly who was and who wasn't a council chief, only to find himself deposed in January 1884.

William N. Fenton describes Newhouse as a conservative Mohawk, responding to the realities of political life in the Six Nations reserve, where the influential Mohawks wanted to defend the traditional priority of the council but also sought reform in assigning chief positions based not on appointment by women leaders of clans but by popular vote, as well as a way to change the power structure of the council.

Gibson, like Newhouse, was well known for his renditions of the epic story and law-telling, but unlike Newhouse he was concerned with preserving the narrative tradition and was a "great advocate" for the traditional council system of a fixed set of rotiyanehson appointed by women leaders of clans in each nation. Some see Gibson as a major traditional chief, though others regard him as less traditional and more innovative in systematizing traditions amongst the various nations' versions of the Great Law of Peace, and "inventing" a singular tradition based upon his learning of the epic from his old Onondaga teacher.

=== 1899 ===
Newhouse tried multiple times to have his rendition of the epic approved by the Grand River Council but failed in his last attempt in 1899. It was rejected, according to Fenton and Weaver, because Newhouse overemphasized Mohawk prominence within the Haudenosaunee confederacy. He assigned to the Mohawks priority in several ways: as the first tribe to accept the message of Great Peacemaker, as the tribe with veto authority in the council, as well as an overall priority given to the work of Hiawatha over that of Peacemaker himself. Others claimed that Newhouse had failed to understand the reality of the council to begin with.

Gibson's first attempt at rendering the epic in the Onondaga language for publication was recorded and translated in 1899 by J. N. B. Hewitt, but not published until 1928, though segments were published in 1916 and 1944. Gibson's goal in delivering a rendition to Hewitt was possibly to have it circulate in the United States and impress upon the U.S. government to oppose the Canadian government's actions. Hewitt's notes were re-translated by William N. Fenton and Gibson's son Simeon in 1941, but their translation is only available through the Smithsonian archives, as well as those of the American Philosophical Society Library.

The transliteration Hewitt made of the original language ran to 189 pages. Fenton and Vecsey both say that before the publication of the 1912 version in 1992, Hewitt's 1899 translation is the most satisfactory. While the text is not available for inspection on the internet, there are comments about it by Fenton: in the 1899 version the Great Peacemaker's canoe is made of white birch instead of white stone and his mother is Jigonsaseh (or Jigonhsasee), the "Peace Queen" and "Mother of Nations", generally accepted as a co-founder of the confederacy with Peacemaker and Hiawatha, although her presence in the story is affected by attitudes against women.

Barbara Alice Mann examines the encounter with Jigonsaseh and Peacemaker's mission as part of a vegetarian-versus-carnivore approach to life and culture.

In Gibson's 1899 version, the encounter with Jigonsaseh happens before meeting the cannibal; this episode where Jigonsaseh is the first to accept Peacemaker's revelation is the basis of why women get to appoint chiefs in traditional culture. Later, Jigonsaseh joins Peacemaker in crowning the first official chiefs of the Haudenosaunee with antlers. In this first of Gibson's versions, the cannibal is Hiawatha; in the later 1900 version that will change to match Newhouse; and in the 1912 version the cannibal is unnamed and Hiawatha is among the Mohawks demanding Peacemaker go through an ordeal to prove he is sent by the Creator. The appearance of a cannibal in the story is controversial and even rejected by some, but most accept it. In the 1899 version, Hiawatha – after setting aside his cannibal ways – rescues Peacemaker from the river ordeal. All three versions include Hiawatha losing his daughters; and Hiawatha's episode with the lake and wampum come later and at Peacemaker's instruction. Overall, Gibson's first version has fewer story elements than his other versions and fewer than Newhouse's. However, it is generally considered the finest extant version written prior to the 1912 version that was translated in 1992.

=== 1900 ===
Gibson was the primary author of the "Chiefs' version" endorsed by the Council of Chiefs of the Six Nations of the Grand River reserve in counterpoint to Seth Newhouse's earlier version. It was rendered into English by the committee of the Council itself. It was later published, first by Duncan Campbell Scott in 1911, and then by Arthur C. Parker in 1916. The only significant difference between these two is that Parker's version included punctuation marks. Both incorporate the original introduction included with the version the council endorsed; however, the commentary about borrowing miraculous qualities from Christianity was introduced at a second meeting of the committee when Gibson was not present and some Christian chiefs were. Regardless of the introduction, Gibson's "Chiefs' version" was considered authoritative and Parker's publication has been echoed many times on the internet.

The question arises that if the dispute between Christians and "Longhouse" traditionalist (whether Handsome Lake Code followers or not) Haudenosaunee was essentially an internal matter, why did the Chiefs present it in English? The Superintendent of the Canadian Department of Indian Affairs was aware of the tensions in the council and was against imposing external election mechanics upon the Haudenosaunee, but was prevented from asserting his position by his supervisor. The Superintendent's inability to act coincided with a period of serious confrontation among some Haudenosaunee over property. Confrontations were also taking place during protests over the possible imposition of the voting approach, with the shooting of Jake Fire May 1. A large part of Haudenosaunee society wanted matters settled not by the Superintendent but by their Council. It is possible the Chiefs' version was presented in English to communicate both outwardly and inwardly the vitality and authenticity of the traditional processes. However, a theological difference between Gibson's 1899 rendition and his Chiefs' version reflects the effect Christian chiefs were having on the committee: in the 1899 version both Peacemaker and his message are portrayed as coming from the sky world, while the Chiefs' 1900 version has only the message and not Peacemaker coming from the sky world.

=== 1912 ===
The 1912 version Gibson gave in Onondaga was transcribed onto 525 pages by Alexander Goldenweiser. The version ultimately published is not complete – some 14 pages of the original record are missing. Gibson died suddenly four months after offering the version to Goldenweiser. Goldenweiser himself never published a translation and in 1934 turned his notes over to Fenton. Fenton worked on a translation in consultation with Gibson's sons and others; Fenton referred to the results but never published his work on the translation itself, though Hanna Woodbury consulted his unpublished notes. Floyd Lounsbury also worked on a translation but only managed some 21 pages. Some unclarity in the notes required Woodbury to elicit the story from speakers between 1978 and 1990. Woodbury also had to deal with differences in the Onondaga language between New York and Six Nations speakers; she observed that the Six Nations Onondaga had more borrowed words from other Haudenosaunee nations and that Gibson's original was closer to the New York dialect by her time. In addition, Woodbury believed that the exact context of the kinship relationships among the Haudenosaunee nations has been lost since Gibson's use of the words, though the root meaning still implies relationships among speakers of Haudenosaunee languages. Woodbury calls the 1912 version Gibson's "most mature understanding."

In 1924 the Canadian government finally imposed a system based on voting by the male Haudenosaunee of the reserve, upsetting several Haudenosaunee standards in the process.
