= Onondaga Council =

Type
- Type: Unicameral

Leadership
- Thadodá·hoˀ: Sid Hill

Structure
- Seats: 14 Onondaga Hoyaneh
- Political groups: Non-aligned assembly (Consensus based)
- Length of term: Life tenure (can be recalled by Clan Mother)

Elections
- Voting system: Condolence by Clan Mothers

Meeting place
- Onondaga

Constitution
- Great Law of Peace

The Onondaga Council is the traditional government of the Onondaga people and modern government of the Onondaga Nation, a sovereign nation that lives on a portion of its ancestral territory and maintains its own distinct laws, language, customs, and culture. The Nation follows the ancestral Haudenosaunee governance system under the Great Law of Peace, as opposed to being governed by a republican Council.

== History ==
The Onondaga Council was established between the 12th and 16th century by the Great Peacemaker, Hiawatha, and Jigonhsasee as a section of the Haudenosaunee Grand Council, composed of fifty Hoyaneh. Fourteen Onondaga Hoyaneh were appointed to the Grand Council and to form their own national council for the Onondaga. The Grand Council could not interfere in the internal affairs of the five constituent nations; its role was limited to matters of national and international importance. Tadodaho, who had initially opposed the formation of the Haudenosaunee League, was raised up as chair of both councils.

Following the collapse of Haudenosaunee unity in the American Revolutionary War and the post-war influx of European settlers, many Onondaga left their homeland for the Six Nations of the Grand River reserve in Ontario. Those that remained in New York established the Onondaga Nation, which adopted the traditional Onondaga Council as its governing system.

== Structure ==
The Onondaga Council consists of fourteen Hoyaneh, also known as chiefs or Sachems. A person serves as Hoyaneh for life and the Clan Mother helps to identify leaders in their clan to serve in this position. Hoyaneh are envisioned as living heirs of the founding fifty members of the Grand Council and bear hereditary names condoled by their Clan Mother. The Clan Mother can remove the Hoyaneh from office if she judges him to have acted outside his responsibilities.

Within the Onondaga Council, the fourteen Onondaga Hoyaneh are divided into three separate benches, which must each reach consensus before a motion can advance. When the three branches are in consensus, the council is said to be "Of One Mind". The Hoyaneh make decisions to protect their people, looking forward seven generations to the future in each decision.

A Confederacy of Haudenosaunee exists, but no longer has formal political function. The Grand Council of the Haudenosaunee League is composed of 50 Hoyaneh alongside six Tuscarora chiefs and follows the same structure of consensus-based government. The Hoyaneh are all considered to have an equal voice. The seats on the Grand Council are distributed among the Six Nations as follows:

- 14 Onondaga
- 10 Cayuga
- 9 Oneida
- 9 Mohawk
- 8 Seneca
- 6 Tuscarora (observer status)

The Great Peacemaker leads the Council in effigy. He is the embodiment of supreme sacrifice since it is Ionhawatha who was held to the Mohawk fires. As the Tadodaho reigns to resolve Ionhawatha's dead children, so will The Great Peacemaker be held to relevancy in light of universal suffrage.

== Onondaga Chiefly Titles ==
The Onondaga send fourteen chiefs to the Haudenosaunee Grand Council to serve as Fire-Keepers of the Confederacy:

Onondaga Hodiyanéshu’
Roll call number	Roster number	Title (Note: Onondaga Nation spelling)	Gloss	Clan	Alternative spellings
19	Oa-1	Thadodá·hoʼ	Entangled	Eel	Tadodahoh
20	Oa-2	Honeʼsä́·heñ·ʼ	Ties up something	Wolf	Gane’se:he:
21	Oa-3	Dehatgáhdoñs	Looking about	Beaver	Dehatgahdos
22	Oa-4	Sganyaʼdají·wak	His dark throat	Wolf	Honya’daji:wak
23	Oa-5	Aweʼgéñhyat	On the surface	Wolf	Awe’ge,hyat
24	Oa-6	Dehayaʼtgwá·ih	Half his body	Turtle	Dehayatgwae
25	Oa-7	Honoñwiyéhdih	He conceals something	Wolf	Honowiyehdi
26	Oa-8	Gowaneñʼséñ·doñh	Hanging object	Deer	Gawe,ne,se,:doh
27	Oa-9	Hahí·hoñh	Spills it	Deer	Hahi:hoh
28	Oa-10	Hoyoñ·nyeñ·níh	He made it for him	Eel	Hoyo:ny,nih:
29	Oa-11	Shodegwá·jiʼ	Bruiser	Eel	Sodegwa:se,:
30	Oa-12	Shagogéñhe·ʼ	He saw the people	Eel	Sagoge,he:
31	Oa-13	Sä·há·wih	Carries an ax	Deer	Sä·há·hwih or Se,:ha:wi:
32	Oa-14	Sgana·wá·dih	Over the swamp	Turtle	Sganawadih

== See also ==
- Onondaga Nation
- Onondaga people
- Onondaga Reservation
- Haudenosaunee Confederacy Chiefs Council
