= Dish With One Spoon =

Term in North American Indigenous law

A Dish With One Spoon, also known as One Dish One Spoon, is a law used by Indigenous communities of Canada and The Americas since at least 1142 CE to describe an agreement for sharing hunting territory among two or more nations. People are all eating out of the single dish, that is, all hunting in the shared territory. One spoon signifies that all Peoples sharing the territory are expected to limit the game they take to leave enough for others, and for the continued abundance and viability of the hunting grounds into the future. Sometimes the Indigenous language word is rendered in English as bowl or kettle rather than dish.

The phrase "Dish With One Spoon" is also used to denote the treaty or agreement itself. In particular, a treaty made between the Anishinaabe and Haudenosaunee nations at Montréal in 1701 as part of the Great Peace of Montreal is usually called the Dish With One Spoon treaty, and its associated wampum belt the Dish With One Spoon wampum. The treaty territory includes part of the province of Ontario between the Great Lakes and extends east along the north shore of the St. Lawrence River up to the border of Quebec. Some claim it also includes parts of New York and Michigan.

== Other references ==
Indigenous Nations made agreements with neighboring nations to share hunting grounds since time immemorial, however the earliest documented reference to the concept occurs in the Haudenosaunee Great Law of Peace, which one may call the founding constitution of the Haudenosaunee Confederacy. Haudenosaunee oral tradition states this founding was in time immemorial. However, scholars Barbara Mann and Jerry Fields tie a number of oral history stories to the dates of solar eclipses and conclude the Confederacy was formed on August 31, 1142. In addition, they claim archaeological evidence of palisades built around villages and the earliest cultivation of corn supports a date between 900–1200 CE. In the Great Law of Peace there is a specific entreaty to have "no knife near our dish" so that the sharing is guaranteed to be without bloodshed. The Dish With One Spoon reference in the Great Law of Peace expressly mandates conserving the game roaming about in the hunting grounds, as well as requiring its sharing. It also contains a promise to share equally in the harvests of the fields.

In the late 18th century, Ojibwe and Dakota, traditional enemies, agreed to meet each year at the beginning of winter, smoke a peace pipe, and then throughout the hunting season exchange friendly visits, and hunt in the common territory without harming each other. Further south in the current state of Georgia, in the mid 18th century, the Creeks and Cherokee agreed to a peace treaty on Dish With One Spoon terms with the small difference that it specified a dividing line between their hunting territories with some parts being dedicated to each nation.

== Events leading up to the treaty ==
The fur trade generated a huge demand for beaver furs and specifically ones from northern climes which were more desirable because they were thicker. Haudenosaunee wanted the European goods available in trade, so they were almost continually fighting nations in those territories. Montagnais, Algonquin and some Haudenosaunee nations negotiated a peace in 1624 at Trois-Rivières and Québec to share the area for hunting. French and Dutch colonial authorities did not like this peace that did not involve them because it portended a lessening of their economic power. Hence they fostered distrust among the Indigenous Nations which succeeded in breaking the peace within a few years. In September 1645, Wendat, Kichesipirini, Innu, and Mohawk negotiated another peace at Trois-Rivières to share the area for hunting, and renewed it in February 1646. This peace broke down almost immediately when Five Nations warriors raided north and westward into Wendat territory in the fall of 1646. It is probable that the Five Nations did that not only for the superior pelts, but also because they had almost rendered the beaver extinct in their home territory south of Lake Ontario. Five Nations raiding continued and intensified until the 1680s and 90s when the French mounted a serious military offensive against them. In the 1640s, the Mississaugas, an Anishinaabe Nation, in response to Haudenosaunee raiding and to avoid smallpox epidemics decimating sedentary agricultural tribes with whom they shared land, left their traditional territory on the north shore of Lake Ontario and the St. Lawrence River and fled north and west. In the 1670s, with help from the Odawa and Chippewa, they returned and contributed to the growing pressure from the French against the Haudenosaunee.

== The treaty ==
New York colonial documents show that various tribes met in their hunting grounds in the late 1690s to start discussing peace, and in the summer of 1700, representatives of various Anishinaabe and other western nations met with a Haudenosaunee council in Onondaga to discuss peace. At that meeting the western nations requested to be part of the Covenant Chain and to share hunting grounds in accordance with the Dish With One Spoon principle. That was followed by a meeting of chiefs from the Five Nations and 19 other nations at Montréal in September, at which a wampum belt described as "making one joint kettle when we shall meet", most probably the Dish With One Spoon belt, was presented by the Haudenosaunee. All parties agreed to a larger meeting in Montréal the following year at which the Great Peace of Montreal was signed on August 4. A couple of weeks earlier on July 19, the Haudenosaunee had concluded an agreement with the British at Albany where, in an attempt to ensure the protection of the British, they conveyed the entire territory to them. Scholars argue that the two sides had differing understandings of the terms of the conveyance, with the Haudenosaunee expecting only British protection of the territory and the British expecting to be able to extend New York into it.

== After the treaty ==
The Montréal treaty proved to be long lasting, and there are many references to it and to the Dish With One Spoon wampum in the historical record. A few examples:

In 1765, Daniel Claus, Deputy Superintendent General of Indian Affairs, wrote to Sir William Johnson, British Superintendent of Indian Affairs, reminding him of the 1701 treaty at which the French governor had told the agreeing Indigenous Nations that "the Woods, and Hunting Grounds could be no otherwise than in common, and free to one Nation as to another."

In 1793 Six Nations chief Joseph Brant wrote to Indian Affairs superintendent Alexander McKee explaining that the Indian Affairs Department's claim that some part of the country near Grand River belongs to the Six Nations is in error, because about a hundred years earlier there was an agreement to share the lands with other Indigenous Peoples for hunting purposes, and there is a Dish With One Spoon wampum which supports his position. Brant's claim is supported by Mississauga oral tradition which states that the land north of eastern Lake Erie, all of Lake Ontario, and the western north shore of the St. Lawrence River has been Mississauga territory since time immemorial and they agreed to share it in the Dish With One Spoon treaty.

In 1824, Wendat chief Tsaouenhohi told the Legislative Assembly of Lower Canada that about two hundred years earlier seven nations had concluded a treaty to eat with the same spoon from the same bowl. Given that only 123 years had elapsed since the Montréal treaty, it is not clear whether Tsaouenhohi was referring to it or to one of the earlier treaties in the mid 17th century.

During a treaty gathering in 1840, Six Nations wampum keeper John Skanawati Buck presented four wampum belts, including one which commemorated the Dish With One Spoon. Buck stated it represented the first treaty, to share hunting grounds, made between the Anishinaabe and the Six Nations many years earlier in Montréal. Mississauga oral tradition differs, claiming that the treaty was only made with the Mohawks. The belt was kept at Six Nations of the Grand River by Buck until his death in 1893, after which time the belts in his possession were dispersed, with some sold to traders and collectors. The belt was later recorded to be in possession of Evelyn H.C. Johnson who donated it to the Royal Ontario Museum in 1922. The Royal Ontario Museum repatriated the belt to the Six Nations Grand River Territory in 1999.

In 1915, Seth Newhouse, an Onondaga chief, wrote to King George V protesting that the restrictive game laws of the province of Ontario were making it impossible for his people to get enough sustenance from hunting and asking the King to send to them a picture of himself holding the treaty document so they could use it to challenge those laws. The Indian Affairs Department intercepted the letter and it was not delivered.

== Today ==
For some organizations, it is now customary in Canada to acknowledge at meetings and other events that the event is taking place on territory which was and may still be Indigenous territory. The Dish With One Spoon has been incorporated into many territorial acknowledgements for organizations and institutions in the Toronto area, including the Council of Ontario Universities and ministries of the Toronto Conference of the United Church of Canada. Today, some see the treaty as a covenant that applies to all those living in Southern Ontario, including Indigenous Peoples not party to the original treaty, as well as settlers and newcomers.
