= Simeon Gibson =

Cayuga tribe member (1887–1943)

- Born: August 1, 1887; Six Nations Reserve in Tuscarora Township, Ontario
- Disappeared: December 10, 1943; Grand River, Ontario
- Citizenship: Cayuga/Iroquois
- Parents: John Arthur Gibson (father); Mary Skye Gibson (mother)

Simeon Gibson (1 August 1887 – 10 December 1943) was a member of the Cayuga tribe and the Onondaga Longhouse on the Six Nations Reserve. Gibson (Iroquois) worked closely with Iroquois researchers, including Horatio Hale, David Boyle, Mark Raymond Harrington, A.C. Parker, and John Napoleon Brinton (J.N.B.) Hewitt. Gibson worked with these researchers to interpret his father Chief Gibson's two records of the Daganawi:dah legend.

== Early life ==
Gibson was born on August 1, 1887, to Seneca Chief John Arthur Gibson, a member of the Committee of Chiefs, and Mary Skye Gibson. Simeon Gibson was born on the Six Nations Reserve in the Tuscarora Township, Ontario in Brant county, Canada. Gibson was a warrior of the Cayuga tribe and a member of the Onondaga Longhouse on the Six Nations Reserve.

Gibson's mother, Mary Skye (Cayuga/Iroquois), was the brother of Chief Abram Charles, who also served as an informant for J.N.B. Hewitt. By maternal descent, Gibson was Cayuga, but his father, Chief John Gibson, was head chief of the Seneca tribe and was Onondaga [1]. Onondaga was the language of Gibson's longhouse. Simeon Gibson's family reflects the mixed lineages of those on the Six Nations Reserve.

Gibson was fluent in many languages. Gibson spoke in Cayuga with his mother and with his uncle, and his mother spoke in Cayuga to her husband Chief Gibson, although she knew both Cayuga and Onondaga. Chief Gibson spoke Onondaga, and Gibson spoke in Onondaga with his father [2]. Gibson also learned Seneca from his paternal grandmother. When Gibson went to day school, he learned Mohawk and Tuscarora from the children and some English.

Gibson's father, Chief John Gibson died on November 1, 1912, from an apoplectic stroke at the age of 63. Chief Gibson played lacrosse and lost his sight as a result of an accident in a lacrosse game. Chief Gibson was a prophet of the Handsome Lake doctrine and made visits to other Iroquois reserves preaching the gospel, often accompanied by his son.

== Military service ==
Gibson enlisted on March 24, 1916 [17] as a private during World War I in the 215th Battalion, the Indian Battalion of the Hamilton and Dufferin Rifles. Gibson served overseas as a machine gunner for sixteen months on the front lines in Passchendaele, Vimy Ridge, and Arras. Gibson voluntarily enlisted when he was 25 years old. Gibson was gassed during World War I, causing him to have asthma and preventing him from singing and largely speaking. Despite his condition, he still worked to interpret texts on Iroquois laws, rituals, and medicines.

== Collaboration with ethnologists ==
Ethnologists and linguists often visited Chief Gibson when studying Iroquois language and culture, including Horatio Hale, David Boyle, M.R. Harrington, A.C. Parker, John Napoleon Brinton (J.N.B.) Hewitt, and others, and Gibson actively worked with them. Gibson worked closely with J.N.B. Hewitt, a Smithsonian ethnologist, for almost half a century and exchanged correspondence with him. Gibson also worked closely with all anthropologists studying with the Six Nations. His family served as impresarios for F.W. Waugh, A.A. Goldenweiser, and Sir Frances H.S. Knowles.

The Victoria Museum grew their collections by enlisting Native Americans to collect ethnographic objects. In the summer of 1907, Simeon traveled with M.R. Harrington to different parts of the Six Nation Reserve when he collected items for museums in New York City. Harrington obtained ceremonial materials, weapons, games, costumes, and domestic utensils along with burl wood bowls, wooden or stone masks, for the collection of Erastus T. Tefft of New York and the New York State Museum. Linguist Edward Sapir came from Ottawa and employed members of the Gibson family, including Chief John Gibson and his sons Hardy and Simeon Gibson as "roustabouts, pickers, packers, and advance agents" for the Victoria Memorial Museum.

Gibson collaborated on ethnological research conducted by anthropologists among the Six Nations. When Gibson was eight years old in 1899, Simeon guided his blind father over the Grand River to dictate the Daganawi:dah legend "Concerning the League" to J.N.B. Hewitt in Onondaga, who recorded the legend on 189 transcript pages. Goldenweiser recorded the legend thirteen years later in 1912 again from Chief Gibson, this time including details of the ceremony for mourning passed chiefs and "raising" or installing their successors into that role and producing a new 525 page-version. Gibson read phonetic transcription and translated notes obtain by anthropologists into different dialects. Gibson carried a camera tripod for Waugh and operated a gramophone for Goldenweier during their research.

Gibson translated texts for Hewitt during his last trip to the Grand River in 1936. After William Fenton succeeded Hewitt at the Bureau of American Ethnology and after he received Waugh's notes, William Fenton visited the homes of many Iroquois ritualists, including Simeon Gibson, Johnson Jimerson, Howard Sky, Chauncey Johnny John, and Henry Redeye to study the sources and meaning of Iroquois ceremonies and medicine societies. Gibson was one of Fenton's three main interpreters, the other two being Howard Sky and James Skye.

Fenton actively collaborated with Gibson on ethnological research. Gibson also described the entire ceremonial cycle of the Onondaga Longhouse to Fenton in 1940. In winter 1941, Gibson facilitated the recordings of songs of the Longhouse repertoire, including medicine society rites. Fenton also acquired the meaning of manes in The Roll Call of the Iroquois Chiefs. with the help of Six Nations residents Howard Skye and Simeon Gibson. Fenton sought out Gibson to interpret texts, including translating his father's description of the Daganwi:dah legend on Onondaga into English in November 1941.

Gibson hoped to arrange a documentary film with recordings of the condolence ceremony, where the Daganawi:dah epic was enacted for "raising" or installing new chiefs but it was never realized. In autumn 1941, Fenton received a grant from the American Council of Learned Societies to work with Gibson for a month in Brantford interpreting the recorded legend. Fenton communicated with his wife and children through written letters during his collaboration with Gibson, and at the end of each day spent translating and interpreting the legend, Gibson would tell Fenton a children's folktale to include in a letter to Fenton's children. Fenton went on to publish the folktales in the New York Folklore Quarterly as "Letters of an Ethnologist's Children."

Gibson was included in plans to visit Washington, D.C., in 1941 to translate the first version of the Daganawi:dah Legend recorded by Hewitt, but Gibson's barn became damaged and he could not leave home to travel to Washington, D.C.

== Later life ==
Gibson went missing on December 10, 1943, when he crossed the Grand River to purchase groceries at Middletown. Gibson's boat was found on December 15 in Middleport, Ontario, a quarter of a mile from the place where Gibson usually boarded the boat to cross the river from Ontario to his home on the Six Nations Reserve. It is suspected that Gibson drowned during a storm that hit the Niagara peninsula that night. Gibson was 54 years old at the time of his suspected drowning and was survived by his older sister Jemina Gibson, his brother Chief John Hardy Gibson, and children by his late first wife and his second wife. Simeon Gibson's grandson John Dockstader also published work on the Six Nations Iroquois.

William Fenton, Senior Ethnologist at the Smithsonian praised Simeon Gibson's contributions to anthropology after he died, including his work with J.N.B. Hewitt. Fenton remarked that "for a half a century almost every ethnologist who went to the Six Nations retained Simeon Gibson in some capacity." Fenton wrote an obituary about Gibson published an obituary about Gibson in the American Anthropologist in 1943.

The National Anthropological Archives (NAA) currently houses Hewitt and Gibson's notes on the League of the Iroquois. The NAA also houses the correspondence between J.N.B. Hewitt and Simeon Gibson and photographs of Simeon Gibson taken by J.N.B. Hewitt during his fieldwork from 1897 to 1937 on the Six Nations Reservation. The Library and Archives Canada also houses a pamphlet by William Fenton on Simeon Gibson.
