= Nature–culture divide =

Theoretical foundation of anthropology

The nature–culture divide is the notion of a dichotomy between humans and the environment. It is a theoretical foundation of contemporary anthropology that considers whether nature and culture function separately from one another, or if they are in a continuous biotic relationship with each other.

In East Asian society, nature and culture are conceptualized as dichotomous (separate and distinct domains of reference). Some researchers consider culture to be "man's secret adaptive weapon" in the sense that it is the core means of survival. It has been observed that the terms "nature" and "culture" can not necessarily be translated into non-western languages, for example, the Native American scholar John Mohawk utilizes the term nature to describe "everything that supports life on the planet," specifically when discussing the limits of science to ever fully understand nature's complexity.

It has been suggested that small-scale societies can have a more symbiotic relationship with nature. Less symbiotic relations with nature limit small-scale communities' access to water and food resources. It was also argued that the contemporary man-nature divide manifests itself in different aspects of alienation and conflicts. Greenwood and Stini argue that agriculture is only monetarily cost-efficient because it takes much more to produce than one can get out of eating one's own crops, stating that "high culture cannot come at low energy costs".

During the 1960s and 1970s, Sherry Ortner drew a parallel between the divide and gender roles, with women as nature and men as culture. Feminist scholars question whether the dichotomies between nature and culture, or man and woman, are essential. For example, Donna Haraway's works on cyborg theory and companion species gesture toward a notion of "naturecultures": a new way of understanding non-discrete assemblages relating humans to technology and animals.

== History ==
Within European culture, land was an inherited right for each family's firstborn son, and every other child had to find another way to own land. European expansion was motivated by this desire to claim land and extract resources through technological developments or the invention of public trading companies. Other motivations included religion (e.g. the Crusades) and discovery (e.g. voyages). In addition to the desire for expansion, Europeans had the resources for external growth. They had ships, maps, and knowledge—a complex of politics, economy and military tactics that they believed to be superior for ruling. These factors helped them to possess and rule the peoples of the lands they came into contact with. One major element of this was the strong Western European cultural belief in private property.

Colonialists from Europe saw the American landscape as desolate, savage, dark and waste, and thus in need of taming in order for it to be safe and habitable. Once cleared and settled, these areas were depicted as "Eden itself." Land was a commodity and as such, anyone who did not use it to turn a profit could have it taken from them. John Locke was one of those responsible for these ideals. Commodification did not end with the acquisition of land. Profit became the main driver for all resources that followed, including slavery. The cultural divide that existed between Europeans and the native groups they colonised allowed the Europeans to capitalise on both local and global trade. Whether the rule of these other lands and peoples was direct or indirect, European ideals and practices spread to nearly every country on the globe. Imperialism and globalisation also contributed to the creation of European dominion, though not without challenges.

The native groups they encountered took a more holistic view of their relationship with the land. They saw the land as a shared entity of which they were a part, whereas the Europeans saw it as a commodity that could and should be divided and owned by individuals, to be bought and sold as they pleased. The concept of "wilderness" implies that the connection between humans and nature is broken. For native communities, human intervention was a part of their ecological practices.

== Theories ==
=== The Role of Society ===
Existing conservation movements span a spectrum of environmental thought. Büscher and Fletcher present these movements on a condensed map which, though simplified, plots the major conservation movements together and highlights elements of their philosophy. The movements are mainstream conservation, new conservation, neoprotectionism, and the authors' newly proposed convivial conservation. Each movement is plotted against two major factors: capitalism and the human-nature divide. Mainstream conservation supports both the human-nature divide and capitalism; new conservation supports the human-nature divide but rejects capitalism; neoprotectionism rejects capitalism but supports the human-nature divide; and convivial conservation rejects both the human-nature divide and capitalism. This newest movement, though reminiscent of previous ones, sets itself apart by addressing the political climate more directly. The authors argue this is important because without it, their movement would gain as little traction as those before it. In their view, lasting change will come not only from an overhaul in human-nature relations and capitalist thought but also from a political system that enacts and supports these changes.

=== The Role of Science ===
The nature–culture divide is intertwined with the social versus biological debate, since each implies the other. In earlier forms of anthropology, genetic determinism was believed to de-emphasise the importance of culture, making it obsolete. However, more modern views hold that culture is more significant than nature because everyday aspects of culture have a wider impact on how humans see the world than genetic makeup alone. Some older anthropologists separated the two, such as Franz Boas, who claimed that social organisation and behaviour are purely the transmission of social norms and not necessarily the passing of heritable traits. Instead of using such a contrasting approach, more modern anthropologists see Neo-Darwinism as an outline for culture, in which nature essentially guides how culture develops. When looking at adaptations, anthropologists such as Daniel Nettle state that animals choose their mates based on their environment, which is shaped directly by culture. The adaptations seen in nature are a result of evoked nature, which is defined as cultural characteristics which shape the environment and that then cue changes in phenotypes for future generations. Put simply, cultures that promote more effective resource allocation and a chance for survival are more likely to be successful and produce more developed societies and cultures that feed off each other.

Transmitted culture can also bridge the gap between the two, because it uses a trial- and- error approach that shows how humans are constantly learning, and that they use social learning to influence individual choices. This is best seen in how even the more superficial aspects of culture are intertwined with nature and genetic variation. For example, beauty standards are embedded in culture because they are associated with better survival rates, yet they also serve personal interests, which allows individual breeding pairs to understand how they fit into society. By learning from each other, nature becomes more intertwined with culture since they reinforce each other.

Sandra Harding critiqued dominant science as "posit[ing] as necessary, and/or as facts, a set of dualisms—culture vs. nature; rational mind vs. prerational body and irrational emotions and values; objectivity vs. subjectivity; public vs. private—and then links men and masculinity to the former and women and femininity to the latter in each dichotomy". Instead, Harding argues for a more holistic approach to knowledge-seeking which recognizes that every attempt at objectivity is bound up in the social, historical, and political subjectivity of the knowledge producer.

== Real-World Examples ==
=== National Parks ===
There is a historical belief that wilderness must not only be tamed to be protected but that humans also need to be outside of it. However, there have been instances where the removal of people from an area has increased illegal activities and negative environmental effects. Although national parks are not particularly known as places of increased violence, they perpetuate the idea of humans being removed from nature to protect it. They also create a symbol of power for humans over nature, as these sites have become tourist attractions. Ecotourism, even with environmentally friendly practices in effect, still represents a commodification of nature.

Another example can be seen in "the great frontier." The American frontier became the nation's most sacred myth of origin. Yet the lands protected as monuments to the American past were constructed as pristine and uninhabited by removing the people that lived and survived on those lands. Some authors have come to describe this type of conservation as conservation-far, where humans and nature are kept separate. At the other end of the conservation spectrum is conservation-near, which mimics native ecological practices of humans integrated into the care of nature.

== See also ==
- Nature versus nurture
