= Oteyboydak Tleukabyl uly =

Kazakh healer (1388–1478)

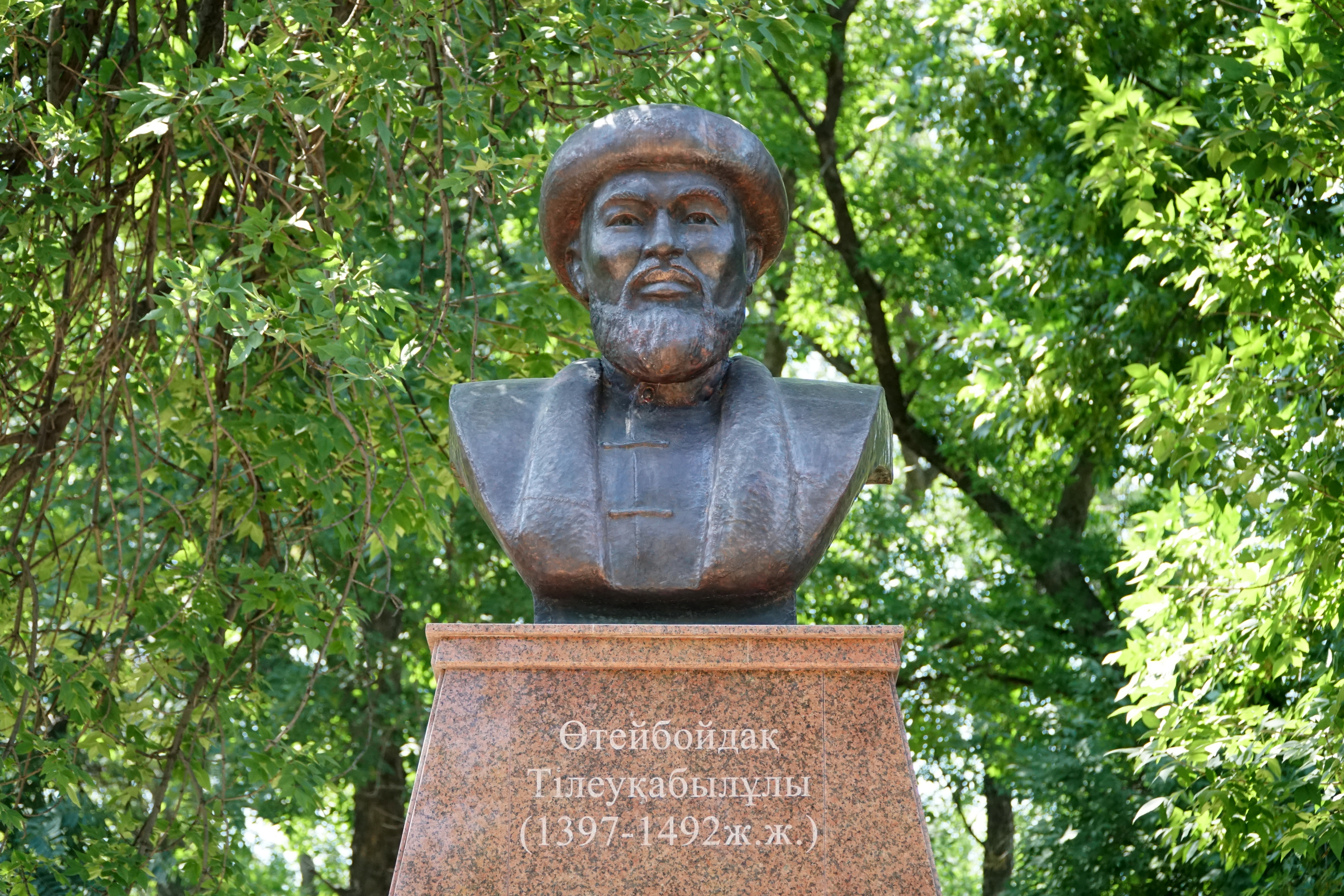
Statue of Oteyboydak Tleukabyluly in Shymkent

Oteyboydak Tleukabyluly (1388–1478), was a Kazakh scientist, healer and author of the medical and ethnographic work, Shipagerlik Bayan. He was familiar with the second Khan of the Kazakh Khanate, Zhanibek Khan, and the legendary Kazakh orator, Zhirenshe Chechen. Tleukabyluly was a well-known public figure and administrator. In Shipagerlik Bayan he writes that he started writing the book at the request of Zhanibek Khan at the age of 70, and finished it at age 85, after Zhanibek Khan's death. There is evidence that Oteyboydak died at the age of 90.

Traditional Kazakh medicine has deep roots in the nomadic heritage of the Kazakh people. Tleukabylulu's Shipagerlik Bayan, written in the 15th century, describes its connection with nature, use of spiritual healing, and the role of the heart, brain, liver, and other organs in the human body. It describes the treatment of burns, frostbite, and the preservation of roots and other ingredients. Tleukabyluly brought traditional Kazakh medicine to the academic system, raising it to a high level. In this respect, he, like Al-Farabi, despised thirst for fame or wealth, and devoted his life to the study of treatment and healing.

His book Shipagerlik Bayan has survived until today, but only the fourth part; the rest was burnt by the Red Guards during the Cultural Revolution in China. The surviving text gives a lot of information on traditional Kazakh medicine, including the varieties of compounds, mixtures, and over 4000 recipes. His book catalogues the medical properties of 728 kinds of herbal ingredients, 318 medicines of animal origin, 52 types of medicines derived from metals and metalloids, and references to hundreds of anatomical terms. The book has historical and ethnographic importance, as well as adding to the richness of the Kazakh language.

The book was published in Kazakh language Cyrillic script in Urumqi in 1994. Two years later, it was published in Almaty, Kazakhstan. The book received China's National Book Award in 1997. Two public medical centers for studying Tleukabyluly's heritage were created in China. Monuments to Tleukabyluly have been erected in Shymkent and on Shalkode Zhailau in Almaty, and a street was named after him in Almaty.

He most probably introduced the Jetyata rule to become firm law among Kazakh peoples.
