= Flag of the Haudenosaunee Confederacy =

Indigenous peoples' flag

Haudenosaunee
- The flag of the Haudenosaunee Confederacy
- Proportion: 3:5
- Adopted: 1980s
- Design: A purple flag with four connected white rectangles and an eastern white pine tree in the center.
- Designed by: Rick Hill; Harold and Tim Johnson

The flag of the Haudenosaunee Confederacy or Iroquois flag is a purple flag with four connected white rectangles and an eastern white pine tree in the center.

== History ==
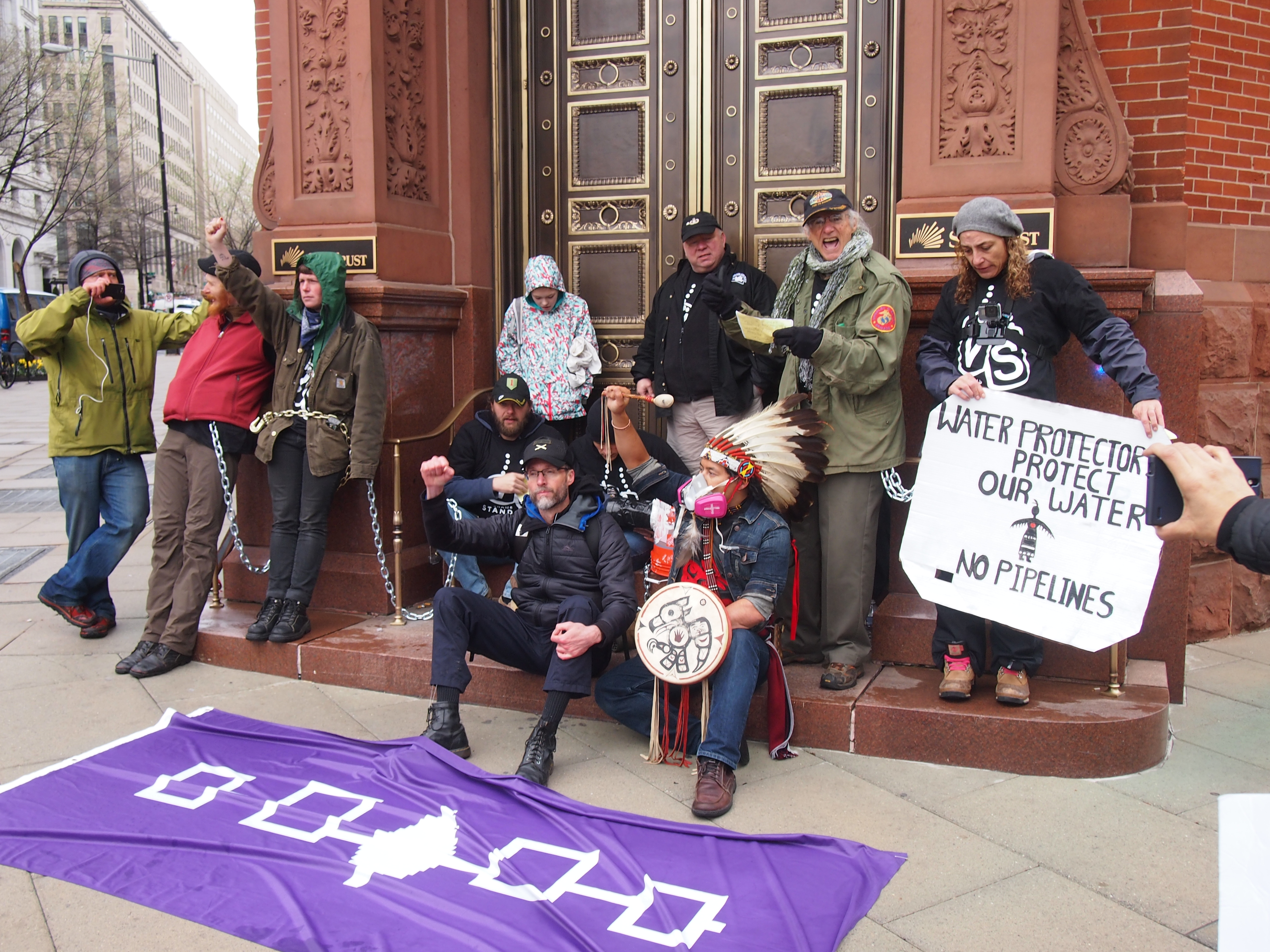
Activists with Iroquois flag at Dakota Access Pipeline protests

In the 1980s, the Haudenosaunee men's national lacrosse team needed a flag ahead of a competition in Australia to represent the Haudenosaunee as an independent entity. Rick Hill, a Tuscarora artist, writer, and educator associated with the lacrosse team, worked with Mohawk father-son duo Harold and Tim Johnson of North Tonawanda, New York, to create the design. Harold Johnson ran a t-shirt shop in Niagara Falls, New York, and his son Tim Johnson was a student at the University at Buffalo. Hill's original draft was inspired by Onondaga faithkeeper Oren Lyons and adapted by the Johnsons. The lacrosse team accepted the design and it later became a symbol for the Haudenosaunee.

== Symbolism ==
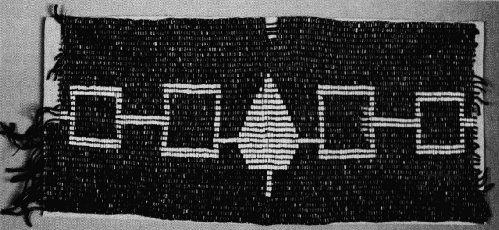
Hiawatha belt

The flag's design is based on the Hiawatha belt, a symbol which dates back to the original uniting of the five tribes of the Haudenosaunee. The wampum belt was a symbol of unity between the five (and later six) tribes for hundreds of years prior to its adaptation for use as a flag.

Purple is considered "the color of the Iroquois", and is the color of the wampum beads produced from the shell of the quahog clam, while the white derives from the white beads of the channeled whelk. The four squares and one tree each represent one of the original five nations of the Haudenosaunee. From left to right they are: Seneca, Cayuga, Onondaga (the tree), Oneida, and Mohawk. Their placement on the flag mirrors their geographic placement. The tree, an eastern white pine, represents the Tree of Peace within the Onondaga nation, where the five nations united to form the Haudenosaunee. Fittingly, the needles of the eastern white pine are clustered in groups of five.

== See also ==
- Flags of Native Americans in the United States
- Haudenosaunee
- Wampum
- Vexilloid
