= John Mohawk =

American historian

John Mohawk (Sotsisowah, 30 August 1945 – 13 December 2006) was a Haudenosaunee historian, writer, and social activist.

== Background ==
John Mohawk was a Seneca, born into the Turtle Clan (Ha'no:wa:h) on the Cattaraugus Reservation (Ga’dä꞉gë́sgë꞉öʼ) in western New York State. He graduated from Hartwick College with a Bachelor of Arts degree in history in 1967, and later earned a Ph.D. from the University at Buffalo.

== Work ==
Mohawk was a major visionary of the Haudenosaunee Confederacy of Nations who played an important role in fashioning the intellectual bridge of the traditional Indian movement toward the national and international community. Based in the traditional Seneca Longhouse, he was a practitioner, singer, and orator. He was also a writer, journalist, researcher, and lecturer. A specialist in the field of culture and community economic development and an activist and commentator on the cultural survival of indigenous peoples, Mohawk was a traditionalist, social activist, and negotiator in local and international conflicts. He helped negotiate the conflict between the Sandinista government of Nicaragua and the Miskito people in 1983, and was a peace guide at armed standoffs between Native traditionalists and government agencies in North America.

Mohawk was a co-founder of several organizations supporting Native Americans in the United States and internationally, such as the Indigenous Peoples Network and the Emergency Response International Network, the Seventh Generation Fund, the Indian Law Resource Center and the Iroquois White Corn Project. He worked to revitalize indigenous agriculture, healthy food (e.g., Iroquois white corn) and the "Slow Food" movement. He was a journalist, a longtime editor, and contributor to "Akwesasne Notes", "Daybreak", and "Indian Country Today," and director of the Center for Indigenous Studies at the Center of the Americas State University of New York (SUNY) in Buffalo, New York.

== Books ==
- The Iroquois Creation Story: John Arthur Gibson and JNB Hewitt's Myth of the Earth Grasper
- Utopian Legacies: A History of Conquest and Oppression in the Western World
- The Red Buffalo
- Thinking in Indian, a posthumously published collection of essays, edited by Jose Barreiro, is in print (Fulcrum).

He was also a co-editor of Exiled in the Land of the Free (with Oren Lyons ), and primary author of A Basic Call to Consciousness (Akwesasne Notes/Farm Publishing Company), the classic collective work of the Haudenosaunee Grand Council (c. 1976–77) on the meaning of traditionalism as a guide to political activism. Basic Call to Consciousness is perhaps the most significant volume in the early documents of International Indigenous activism.

== Recognition ==
He was a Doctor Honoris Causa of several universities, winner of journalism awards from the Native American Journalists Association (NAJA), as well as a teacher, mentor, and educator of several generations of Indian people who became activist scholars.

== See also ==
John Arthur Gibson
