= Longhouse Religion =

Religion including traditional Haudenosaunee beliefs and Christian elements

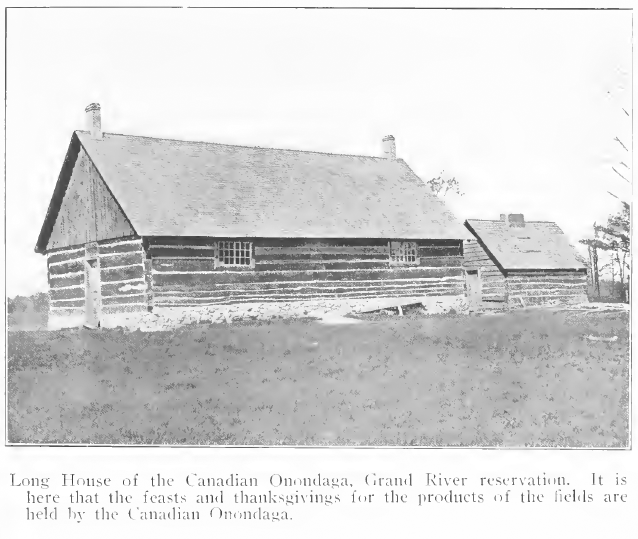
Onondaga longhouse on the Six Nations Reservation in the early 1900s

The Longhouse Religion is the popular name of the religious movement also known as the Code of Handsome Lake or Gaihwi:io/Kaliwihyo (Good Message), founded in 1797/1799 by the Seneca prophet Sganyodaiyoʼ (Handsome Lake). The movement is associated with the teachings Handsome Lake preached after his visions and is commonly described as a response to the profound social and political disruptions of the post-Revolutionary era. This movement draws on older Haudenosaunee religious traditions while also incorporating selected Christian influences; some Haudenosaunee sources present it as a continuing Indigenous religious tradition and moral code. Haudenosaunee sources also indicate that the teachings remain active in community and educational life.

Anthropologist Anthony F. C. Wallace reported that the Gaihwi:io had about 5,000 practicing members as of 1969. Originally the Gaihwi:io was known as the "new religion" in opposition to older Haudenosaunee religious practices, but has since become known as the "Old Way" in opposition to Christianity.

== Etymology ==
Prior to the adoption of the single-family dwelling, the Haudenosaunee lived in large, extended-family homes known as longhouses which also served as meeting places, town halls, theaters, and sites for religious ceremonies. Gaihwi:io keeps the longhouses for ceremonial purposes, and the movement was therefore termed the "Longhouse Religion". In the constituent languages of the Haudenosaunee, the religion is known by names translating to "Good Message":

- Mohawk: Kariwiio
- Oneida: kalihwíy̲o̲
- Onondaga: Gaihwiyóh
- Cayuga: Gaihwí:yo:
- Seneca: Gáíwi:yo:h

== Origins ==
Handsome Lake is visited by the spirit of corn, by Jesse Cornplanter

At the age of 64, after a lifetime of poverty and alcoholism, Sganyodaiyoʼ received his revelations while in a trance, after which he ceased drinking and formed the movement. His teachings emerged in the aftermath of major upheaval among the Seneca and other Haudenosaunee peoples, including war, land loss, dispossession, and intense social disruption in the late eighteenth and early nineteenth centuries. The message he preached, later known as the Gaihwi:io or “Good Message,” called for moral reform, social renewal, and the restoration of right living within Haudenosaunee communities. Sganyodaiyoʼ's teachings were encoded in wampum and spread through the populations of western New York State, Pennsylvania, and Haudenosaunee country, eventually being known as The Code of Handsome Lake.

Handsome Lake vested responsibility for preaching the Gaihwi:io in a number of "holders of the Gaihwi:io", as of 1912 six in number. Since the transmission was oral, the versions began to diverge. Nineteenth- and early twentieth-century efforts to compare, standardize, and transcribe the teachings reflected concern for preserving the integrity of an important Haudenosaunee religious tradition. In the 1860s the holders of the Gaihwi:io met at Cold Spring at the former home of Handsome Lake. They compared versions and, when differences were found, Seneca Chief John Jacket adjudicated and codified the correct version, writing in the Seneca language on letter paper. When he was done, the group reassembled at Cattaraugus and memorized this recension. Chief Jacket gave the written copy to Chief Henry Stevens, who in turn passed it on to Chief Edward Cornplanter, who somehow lost it. In 1903, afraid that oral transmission would again lead to errors, Chief Cornplanter rewrote it from memory and deposited his transcription at the New York State Archives for preservation. William Bluesky, a Baptist lay preacher, translated it into English.

== Practice ==
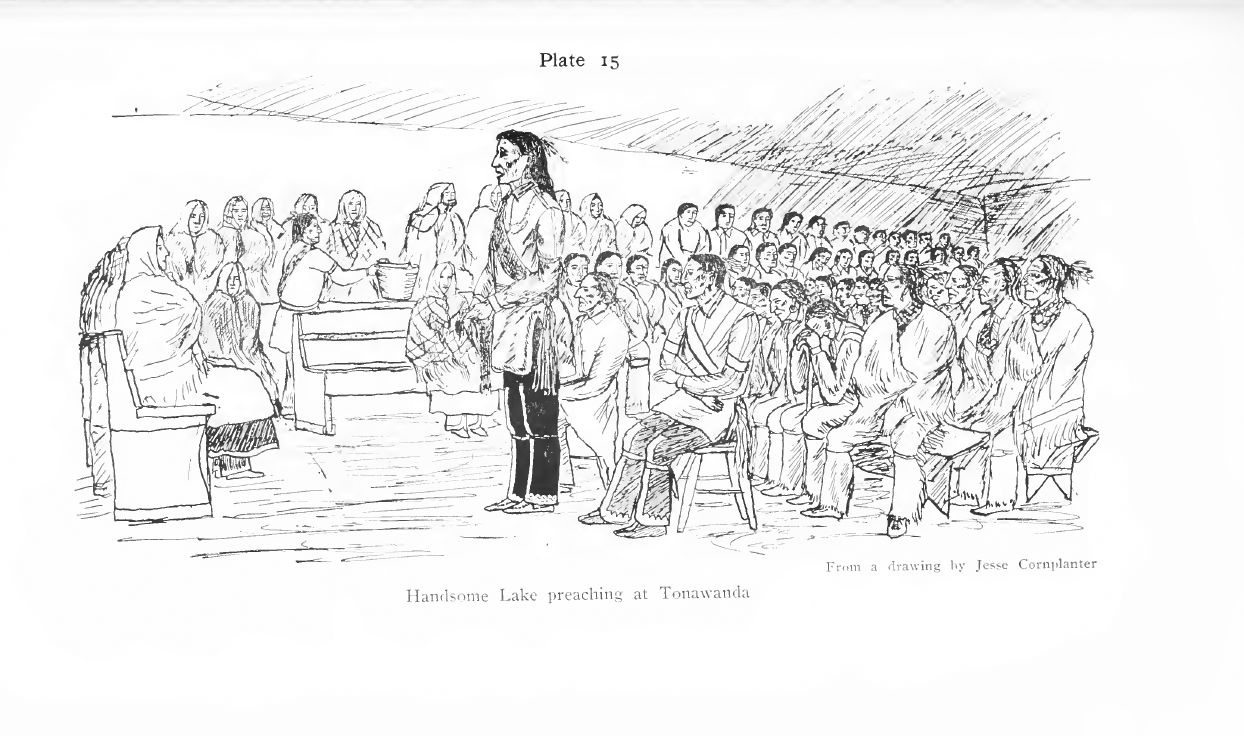
Handsome Lake Preaching at Tonawanda by Jesse Cornplanter

The Gaihwi:io is proclaimed twice a year: at the Midwinter Thanksgiving, which falls sometime between January 15 and February 15, and again at the Six Nations meeting in September. Usually the preachers are exchanged between reservations for the event. A full recitation takes three days, mornings only. Before sunrise on each of the three mornings, the preacher stands before the fireplace of the longhouse and sings the Sun Song to ensure good weather.

During the ceremonies, the preacher has an assistant who sits beside him holding a white wampum strand. Some of the congregation sit on benches placed across the longhouse and the remainder sit on benches placed along the walls. Women cover their heads with a shawl.

The atmosphere at the ceremony somewhat resembles a revival meeting. Participants may be moved to tears, and the emotional atmosphere sometimes becomes so contagious that many publicly re-declare their allegiance to the religion.

== Opposition ==
Some Haudenosaunee traditionalists reject The Code of Handsome Lake as being too heavily influenced by Christianity and the revival culture of the post-contact era. These traditionalists follow the teachings of Deganawidah, The Great Peacemaker as laid down in the Great Law of Peace, which is the constitution of the Six Nations or Haudenosaunee. Although this constitution protects the rights of religious ceremonies which have been in practice prior to ratification and acknowledges the duties of positive role models to the community, critics of the Code have argued that certain teachings associated with Handsome Lake conflict with their interpretation of the Great Law of Peace. Some Haudenosaunee critics of the Handsome Lake tradition have in some activist contexts, embraced pre-Christian symbols such as the red-field sun design popularized by Karoniaktajeh Louis Hall’s Mohawk Warrior Flag.

== Social context ==
The Second Great Awakening was a religious movement in the United States beginning around 1790. It has been described as a reaction against skepticism, deism, and rationalism. This movement was centered in the so-called "Burned-over district" in central and western New York State. Handsome Lake's revelations occurred in the same area and "anticipated by a matter of months the surge of revivals that swept through early national and antebellum America".

At the same time, Haudenosaunee sources and other scholarship place Handsome Lake's teachings in the context of post-Revolutionary land loss, dislocation, and social crisis among the Seneca and other Haudenosaunee peoples, rather than treating them only as part of the wider evangelical revival culture of western New York.

== Influence ==
Joseph Smith, the founder of Mormonism, is believed to have been influenced by Handsome Lake's revelations, with which his own visions share a resemblance.

== Classification ==
In his 1989 book Popular Religion in America: Symbolic Change and the Modernization Process in Historical Perspective, Miami University professor Peter W. Williams stated that over time the movement became more routinized and more resembles "such 'cultic' religions on the borderline of traditional Christianity such as Mormonism".
