= Iroquois White Corn Project =

- Established: 1997
- Founders: John Mohawk; Yvonne Dion-Buffalo
- Headquarters: Ganondagan State Historic Site, Victor, New York, U.S.

The Iroquois White Corn Project is a cultural and agricultural revitalization initiative based at Ganondagan State Historic Site in Victor, New York. It is focused on restoring the cultivation, processing, and everyday use of traditional Haudenosaunee white corn. The project was founded in 1997 by John Mohawk and Yvonne Dion-Buffalo on the Cattaraugus Reservation. After becoming dormant following their deaths, it was re-established at Ganondagan in the early 2010s under the leadership of G. Peter Jemison.

== Purpose and goals ==
White corn has long been an important food in Haudenosaunee communities, and Ganondagan describes the project as centered on heirloom seed traditions extending back at least 1,400 years. The project's stated goals have included increasing access to white corn as an everyday food, encouraging Haudenosaunee farmers to grow it, and supporting the broader recovery of traditional foodways.

At Ganondagan, the project has combined agriculture, food processing, public education, and cultural programming. White corn is grown, dried, roasted, hulled, ground, and sold in several forms, including whole hulled corn and white corn flour. Public-facing activities such as husking bees, cooking demonstrations, and Indigenous food events have made the project part of a broader effort to connect food sovereignty, cultural continuity, and public interpretation of Seneca and Haudenosaunee history.

The project has also been described as an economic and agricultural model. Outside coverage says it helped create a market for Haudenosaunee-grown white corn and supported related efforts, including the development of Gakwi:yo:h Farms by the Seneca Nation of Indians. By the late 2010s, reports described the Ganondagan-based project as processing roughly 5,000 pounds of white corn products annually.

The Iroquois White Corn Project has been presented as part of a larger Indigenous food revitalization movement in the Northeast. Coverage from Ganondagan and other regional sources frames it not simply as a farming project, but as a revival of knowledge, labor, and community practices tied to a staple crop disrupted by colonization and changing food systems.
