= Sally Weaver (anthropologist) =

Canadian anthropologist (1940–1993)

- Born: August 24, 1940; Fort Erie, Ontario, Canada
- Died: May 5, 1993 (aged 52); Cambridge, Ontario, Canada
- Education: University of Toronto
- Known for: Authority on Canadian First Nations, Iroquois
- Scientific career
- Fields: Anthropology
- Workplaces: University of Waterloo

Sally Weaver (August 24, 1940 in Ontario – May 5, 1993 in Cambridge, Ontario, was a Canadian anthropologist, the first Canadian woman with an anthropology PhD, a former chair of the University of Waterloo Anthropology Department, and an authority on Canadian First Nations.

== Early life and education ==
Not much is known or recorded about Weaver's early life, beyond her birthplace of Fort Erie, Ontario, and limited background on her university studies at the University of Toronto. She earned an honors Bachelor of Arts (anthropology) in 1963, a Master of Arts in 1964, and she completed her PhD in 1967, all at the University of Toronto. Weaver was the first woman to earn a PhD in Anthropology both from the University of Toronto and, more broadly, in Canada.

== Career ==
Weaver joined the University of Waterloo Department of Sociology and Anthropology in the fall of 1966. She is credited with helping develop and grow the University of Waterloo anthropology program from a subset of the Department of Sociology and Anthropology in 1966 to a fully independent Department of Anthropology in 1976. Weaver served as the department's first chair from 1976 to 1979. Weaver was instrumental in founding the Canadian Ethnology Society in 1974, now the Canadian Anthropological Society (CASCA), serving as president from 1975–76.

=== Author ===
Weaver's first book, developed from her doctoral thesis, Medicine and Politics among the Grand River Iroquois: a study of the non-conservatives, was published in 1972.

=== Honors and awards ===
Weaver was a respected scholar and recipient of several awards throughout her career. In 1992, shortly before Weaver's death, the Society for Applied Anthropology in Canada established the Weaver-Trembley award in honor of her work and another well-known Canadian anthropologist, Mark Adélard-Tremblay.

== Death and legacy ==
Weaver died of cancer at 52, in her home at Cambridge, Ontario, Canada. Upon her death, a tuition award was established in her name to recognize her 27 years of service in the Department of Anthropology at the University of Waterloo and her international acclaim as a scholar of applied anthropology.

In November, 1995, the University of Waterloo (UW) Library acquired Weaver's working library and papers, a collection that was certified as a Canadian Heritage Cultural Property in 1994, "a testament to the scholarly and historical value of the collection."

=== "Woman with a Heart" bookplate ===
When her working library and papers were acquired by the UW Library, Tom Hill, a native artist and then director of the Woodland Cultural Centre in Ontario, designed a special bookplate that would be included in all of Weaver's books. The bookplate featured an etching of a photograph of a "Woman with a Heart" wampum belt. The photograph was intended to be "a reflection of Dr. Weaver's lifetime determination and dedication to promote justice and recognition for Indigenous Peoples."
