= Jeti ata =

Tradition among Kazakhs, Kyrgyzs, and Bashkirs

Jeti ata (also Jety-ata Zhety-ata Zheti-ata, Kazakh: Жеті ата, "seven fathers, seven ancestors") is a tradition among the Kazakhs, Kyrgyzs, and Bashkirs (Bashkir: ете быуын), in which one is obligated to know or recite the names of at least seven direct blood ancestors such as father, grandfather, great grandfather and great-great-grandfather etc. This process often has been taught for generations from childhood by parents.

The main reason for knowing their seven ancestors is that among Kazakhs, marriage within seven generations is prohibited, so for a marriage to be licit, the ancestors of the male and female sides must be above the seven ancestors on both father and mother lineages. In the oral tradition of Kazakhs, it is believed that the newborn child will be wise, healthy mentally, and physically strong under the "Jety-Ata" rule.

The second reason is that this tradition is regarded as a helpful means to know and remember the historical background of each Kazakh and their tribes in the past. This Kazakh genealogy called шежіре shejire or shezhire by Kazakhs, and through this system, most of the Kazakhs know their origin and their relations with other tribes within the clan-tribal system of Kazakhs. Each set of seven generations is considered a minimum unit clan in Kazakhs

== Terminology ==
=== Kazakhs ===
The naming method is as follows which starts from the grandson and then descends to the further generations:

1. Nemere - grandchild
2. Shobere - great grandchild
3. Shopshek - great-great-grandchild
4. Nemene - 4th generations
5. Jurezhat - 5th generations
6. Tuazhat - 6th generations
7. Juargat - 7th generations
8. Jegzhat - 8th generations
1. Жеті ата - 7th ancestry
2. Түп ата - 6th ancestry
3. Тек ата - great-great-great-grandfather
4. Баба - great-great-grandfather
5. Арғы ата - great grandfather
6. Ата - grandfather
7. Әке - father
1. Жеті әже - 7th ancestry
2. Түп әже - 6th ancestry
3. Тек әже - great-great-great-grandmother
4. Баба әже - great-great-grandmother
5. Арғы әже - great grandmother
6. Әже - grandmother
7. Ана, шеше - mother

=== Other ethnicities ===
Bashkirs

1. Бала - дитя, ребенок. Балам - (мое) дитя, (мой) ребенок
2. Ейән, ейәнсәр — внук, внучка
3. Бүлә, бүләсәр — правнук, правнучка
4. Тыуа, тыуасар — праправнук, праправнучка
5. Тыуаят — прапраправнук, прапраправнучка
6. Һаратан — прапрапраправнук, прапрапраправнучка
7. Етеят — прапрапрапраправнук, прапрапрапраправнучка
8. Туңаяҡ — прапрапрапрапраправнук, прапрапрапрапраправнучка

Kyrgyz (ancestors)

1. Ата — father
2. Чоң ата — grandfather
3. Баба — great grandfather
4. Буба — great-great-grandfather
5. Кубар — great-great-great-grandfather
6. Жото — great-great-great-great-grandfather
7. Жете — great-great-great-great-great-grandfather

Kyrgyz (descendants)

1. Бала — child
2. Небере — grandchild
3. Чөбөрө — great grandchild
4. Кыбыра — great-great-grandchild
5. Тыбыра — great-great-great-grandchild
6. Чүрпө — great-great-great-great-grandchild
7. Урпак — great-great-great-great-great-grandchild

== See also ==
- Seven generation sustainability
