= Hiawatha =

Cofounder of the Haudenosaunee Confederacy

- Aionwà:tha (Mohawk); Hayeñhwathaʼ (Onondaga)
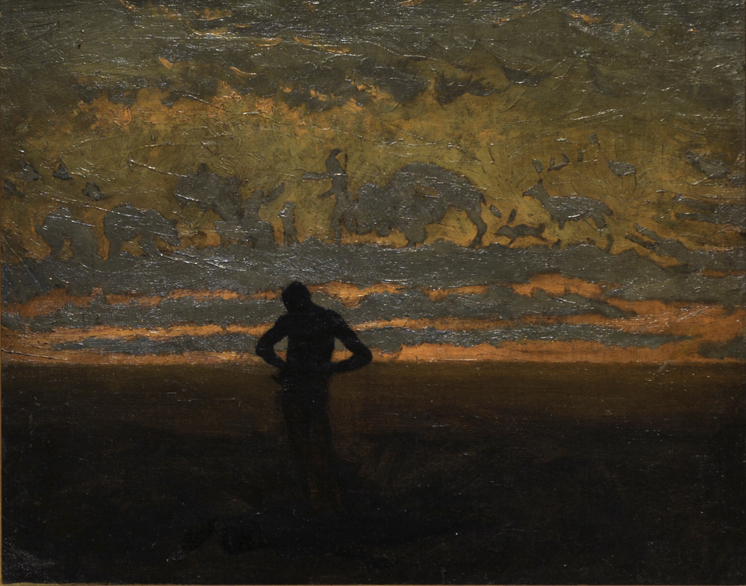
- Hiawatha, 1874 painting by Thomas Eakins
- Born: Twelfth century (or fifteenth century); Onų·dáˀgeh
- Died: 12th century (or 15th century); Haudenosauneega
- Known for: Cofounder and leader of the Haudenosaunee Confederacy

Hiawatha, (Note: /ˌhaɪəˈwɒθə/ HY-ə-WOTH-ə, also US: /-ˈwɔːθə/ -WAW-thə) also known as Ayenwatha or Aiionwatha, (Note: Mohawk: Aionwà:tha; Onondaga: Hayeñhwathaʼ [hajẽʔwaʔtha] or Hayęhwáthaʼ; Cayuga: Hayę́hwataˀ; Seneca: Hayö̀:wë:taʼ) was the cofounder of the Haudenosaunee Confederacy in what is now the eastern Great Lakes region of North America. He is believed to have lived in either the 12th or 15th century. He was a leader of either the Onondaga people, the Mohawk people, or both; according to some accounts, he was born an Onondaga and later adopted into the Mohawks.

== Legend ==
Although Hiawatha was possibly a real person, he was mostly known through his legend. The events in the legend have been dated to the middle 1100s through the occurrence of an eclipse coincident with the founding of the Haudenosaunee Confederacy. (Note: Dates of 1390 or 1630 have also been proposed.) This material and quotations are taken from the Mohawk version of the legend, as related by the prominent chief Seth Newhouse (Dayodekane). For an Onondaga version of the legend, see Parker: "The Hiawatha Tradition".

When the founder of the Confederacy, Dekanawidah, known as The Great Peacemaker, first came to Iroquoia, one of the first people he met was Hiawatha, not yet called by that name. (Note: His original name seems to be not recorded) At that time, Hiawatha was a wild man and a cannibal, known as "the man who eats humans." When Dekanawidah came to his cabin, he climbed onto the roof, looked down through the smoke hole, where there was a large kettle of water for cooking a meal of human flesh. When Hiawatha came home, he looked into the water and saw Dekanawidah's face reflected back to him, which he thought was his own. "In that face he was aware of a beauty, a wisdom and strength, which at first filled him with astonishment and then with shame, for it was not the face of one who killed and ate his fellow men." Dekanawidah came down, sat across the fire from him, and passed on to him the Great Law of Peace. Hiawatha accepted the message, and agreed to stay and work with his own people while Dekanawidah went on to pass the message to other nations.

The principal chief of the Onondaga at that time was a cruel tyrant called Tadodaho, or Atotarho. Tadodaho is described as twisted in both body and mind. "His hair was filled with living snakes. Snakes' eyes looked out from his finger ends." Dekanawidah charged Hiawatha with converting Tadodaho—to "comb the snakes out of [Tadodaho's] hair." He gave him the name Hiawatha, which means "he who combs."

After Dekanawidah left, Hiawatha presented his proposals to the Onondaga in councils, but Tadodaho kept frustrating all his efforts and disrupting the councils. It was claimed he has caused the death of Hiawatha's three daughters and his wife by magic. Grief-stricken, Hiawatha left his village and wandered, "stringing wampum and seeking someone who should understand the thirteen-string ceremony of condolence and take away his grief by the spell of the wampum." Finally, he came to the territory of the Mohawk, where Dekanawidah had converted the entire nation. Dekanawidah chanted the words that have since been part of the Haudenosaunee Requickening Ceremony: "I wipe away tears from thy face, using the white fawn-skin of pity ... I make it daylight for thee ... I beautify the sky. Now shall thou do thy thinking in peace ...". Afterwards, Hiawatha joined Dekanawidah in composing the laws of the Great Peace, and the Peace Hymn.

Then Hiawatha and Dekanawidah, together with the Mohawk chiefs, visited each of the other four Nations. They had no trouble with the Oneidas and the Cayugas, but the Senecas were divided against themselves and the Onondagas were afraid of the power of Tadodaho. A solar eclipse helped convince the Senecas, and the Onondagas were brought in by the power of the other four Nations and by the offer to Tadodaho that he become principal chief. "In the end the mind of [Tadodaho] was made straight, the crooks were taken out of his body, and Hiawatha combed the snakes out of his hair."

Hiawatha was noted for his speaking skills and message of peace. Dekanawidah, a Huron prophet and spiritual leader, proposed the unification of the Haudenosaunee peoples who shared common ancestry and similar languages, but he suffered from a severe speech impediment which hindered him from spreading his proposal. Hiawatha was a skilled orator, and he was instrumental in persuading the Five Nations to accept the Great Peacemaker's vision and band together to become members of the Haudenosaunee Confederacy. The Tuscarora joined the Confederacy in 1722 to become the Sixth Nation. Little else is known of Hiawatha. The reason and time of his death is unknown; however, his legacy is still passed on from generation to generation through oral stories, songs, and books.

== Hiawatha Belt ==
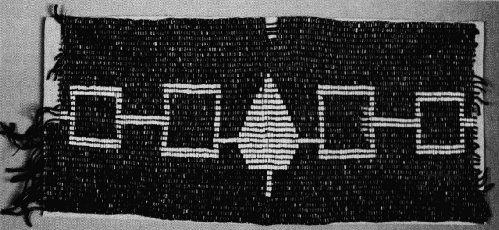
The Hiawatha Belt, depicting the five original tribes of the Haudenosaunee Confederacy and their interconnections

The Hiawatha Belt (Onondaga: Sganodagęäda’gó·nah transl. Great White Mat) is a wampum belt that symbolizes peace between the original five nations of the Haudenosaunee.

The artifact's exact age is unknown, but is estimated to date either to the early 1700s (before the Tuscarora became the sixth nation of the Haudenosaunee Confederacy in 1722), or to the second half of the 18th century, "when purple wampum became abundant".

The belt depicts the nations in a specific order from left to right. The Seneca are furthest to the left, representing their position as Keepers of the Western Door. Next is the Cayuga, and in the center of the belt, depicted with a symbol shaped like a heart or pine tree, is the Onondaga, also known as the Keepers of the Central Fire. Next is the Oneida. Finally, shown farthest to the right is the Mohawk, the Keepers of the Eastern Door. The white line connecting all of the symbols for each tribe together represents the unity of the Haudenosaunee. It also represents the Great Law of Peace and the Haudenosaunee Confederacy as a whole.

A vectorized representation of the Hiawatha Belt

The wampum belt comprises 6,574 or 6,916 black or purplish and white beads made of shells, which are arranged in 38 rows and 173 columns on buckskin thongs, and strung with flax or hemp thread. Found in the Northeastern United States, quahog clam shells are often used for the black and sometimes the white beads of these belts. Most often, the Haudenosaunee used various types of whelk shells for the white beads. According to William N. Fenton (1998), there are several newer beads near the belt's margins (perhaps due to selection or repair), and X-ray analysis identified one bead presumed to be made of colonial lead glass is found near its center. Beauchamp (1901, pp. 411–412) points out that the current belt is a fragment of a longer belt, showing "a great loss at each end"; he continues that: "As the pattern shows that there were [other open castles] beyond these on either hand, this plainly proves that it had no reference to the original league.

Wampum figures in the story of Hiawatha. When Hiawatha was full of grief because his daughters were murdered, the Great Peacemaker gifted Hiawatha with the whelk shells and told him to put them on his eyes and ears and throat. These shells were a sign of healing and purity. Hiawatha used these shells to create unity. The Haudenosaunee Nation believes that the Peacemaker was the one who gifted them the first wampum belt, which later was titled the Hiawatha Belt.

The New York State Museum was in possession of the belt from 1900 until 1989, when it was officially returned to the Onondaga Nation after efforts to reclaim it by Nation leaders.

Today the image of the Hiawatha Belt is used on the flag of the Haudenosaunee Confederacy.

== The Song of Hiawatha ==
The 1855 epic poem The Song of Hiawatha by Henry Wadsworth Longfellow tells the story of a hero of the same name but has no relationship to the historical Hiawatha. The poem has little to do with the actual Hiawatha; Longfellow most likely took the name of Hiawatha and applied it to the Ojibway demigod Manabozho.

Longfellow tells the story of a legendary heroic Native man (Note: He is nowhere identified as Iroquois.) starting from his birth and ending on his ascension to the clouds. It talks of many battles, losses, and moral lessons. Longfellow, along with another writer, Henry Rowe Schoolcraft, hoped to combine stories of Native Americans and create a sense of pride and remembrance for the Native Americans during the 1820s and later.

== See also ==
- Hiawatha, Iowa
- Hiawatha, Kansas
- List of peace activists
