= Tree of Peace =

Haudenosaunee symbol

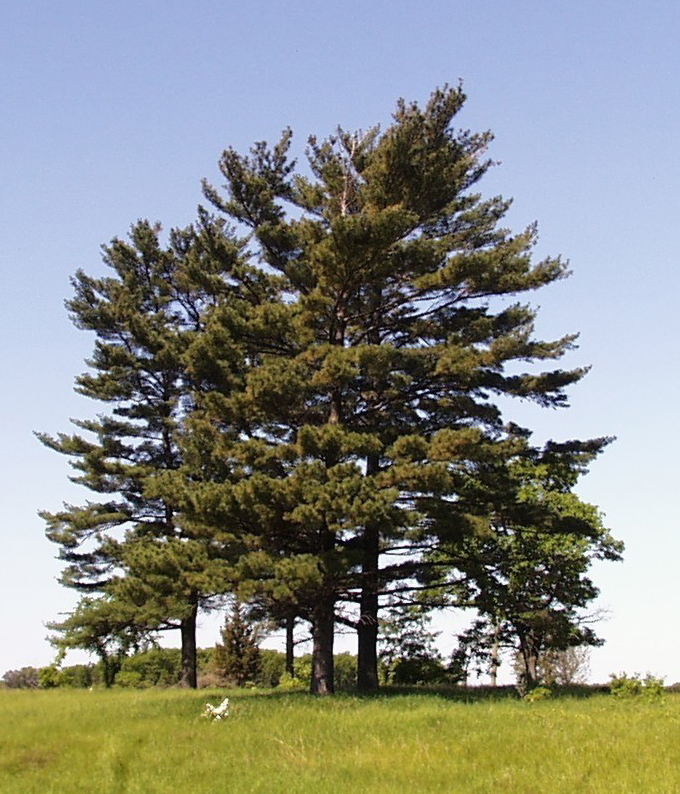
A group of eastern white pines (Pinus strobus)

The Tree of Peace (Note: Mohawk: Onerahtaseʼko:wa; Onondaga: Sgaęhejiʼgó·nah (transl. Great Tall Tree) or Jyonä·hdejiʼgó·nah (transl. Great Long Leaf); Cayuga: Ganradaisgowah or Onrahdajiˀgó:wah (transl. Great Black Leaves); Seneca: Onä́hdajíʼgo:wa:h (transl. great black leaves)) is a symbolic representation of the Haudenosaunee Confederacy and its oral constitution, the Great Law of Peace. The tree, an eastern white pine (Pinus strobus), bears bundles of five needles which symbolize the decision of the five Haudenosaunee nations to reject war and unify into a single confederation.

== Tradition ==
Haudenosaunee oral history describes a man named the Great Peacemaker, or Dekanawida, as a messenger of the Creator who united the Mohawks, Oneidas, Onondagas, Cayugas, and Senecas into the Haudenosaunee Confederacy. At a council of the five nations by Onondaga Lake, the symbol chosen for the League of the Five Nations was the great white pine tree, "the tree of the Great Long Leaves". Its characteristic bundles of five needles became the symbol of the Five Nations joined as one. Together, the five nations planted a white pine and buried their weapons beneath the tree.

The tree had four symbolic roots, the Great White Roots of Peace, (Note: Oneida: ohtehlaseˀkówa; Onondaga: Jyokdehägęädaˀgó·nah; Seneca: Dzokdè:sgo:wa:h) spreading north, east, south, and west. If any other nation ever wished to join the League, it would have to follow the White Roots of Peace to the source and take shelter beneath the tree. Atop the tree, he placed an eagle to scream out a warning at the approach of danger. He symbolically planted the tree in the land of the Onondagas, the place of the Grre, the confederate lords, or peace chiefs, would sit beneath it and be caretakers of the Great Peace.

This tree of peace became the symbol of solitude among the chiefs. The creation of the tree of peace figuratively gave the chiefs the ability never to die, "because their chiefly titles would be passed down to their successors forever. In this way, the League of Nations would always be kept alive".

A. C. Parker states:

The Tree of Peace is an important symbol of peace in Iroquois tradition and in the historical record of diplomacy between the Iroquois and Westerners. Weapons would be buried under a tree to seal a peace agreement. A tree might even be uprooted to create a cavity for the weapons. The replanted tree on top would become a tree of peace. This concept of creating a new Tree of Peace is rooted in the tradition created by Dekanawida's initial ceremony for the Tree of Peace. The roots will stretch in all directions and it is upon these roots our future brothers and sisters must forge their own peace and continue to the path we have created.

Barbara Graymont states:

This transformation of the historical account shows the extent to which these events had taken on a sacred character for the Iroquois. The exact details were not nearly as important to them as testifying to the authenticity of their confederacy and the significance of what their ancestors had done for them. In establishing unity and preserving their nationhood, the ancestors had provided for all time a purpose and a way of life for the people of the Extended lodge.
