= Condolence ceremony =

Part of the Great Law of Peace

The condolence ceremony (Note: Onondaga: Ogayųdų́hsä·ʼ; Seneca: Ajä̀꞉kö́shäʼgo꞉wa꞉h; Tuscarora: Kayę·nę́·taˀθ) or condolence council is a part of the Haudenosaunee Great Law of Peace. It governs succession to political offices after a leader dies, including the succession of the rotiyanehson. Leaders appointed to in this manner are known as condoled chiefs.

The ceremony is held in the community whose leader has died. Attendees are divided into two moieties: the clear-minded and the downcast or bereaved (members of the same clan as the deceased). The ceremony progresses through several stages, including a recitation of the Great Law. Through the ceremony, new leaders are appointed to replace those who have died. It was typically the first item on the agenda when a Haudenosaunee council met.

Among other things, the ceremony recalls the Great Peacemaker's condolence of Hiawatha and the "transformation" of Tadodaho from a state of confusion and disorder to a state of peace.

== Sources ==
- Hertzberg, Hazel W. (1966). The great tree and the longhouse : the culture of the Iroquois. Macmillan Publishers. OCLC 1149214578.
- Williams, Kayanesenh Paul (2018). Kayanerenkó:wa : the Great Law of Peace. University of Manitoba Press. ISBN 978-0-88755-556-5. OCLC 1061095159.
- Wiget, Andrew, ed. (17 June 2013) [1996]. Handbook of Native American literature. Routledge. doi:10.4324/9781315051697. ISBN 978-1-315-05169-7.
