= Seth Newhouse =

Seth Newhouse or Dayodekane (27 January 1842 – 11 June 1921) was a leader of the Haudenosaunee. He advocated for their self-government in the Grand River region of Ontario and worked to record and preserve traditions of the people. In 1885 he arranged a manuscript version of the Great Law of Peace, which has been analyzed since, particularly for its faithfulness to the original.

== Early life ==
Newhouse was born on 27 January 1842 to an Onondaga mother and Mohawk father on the Six Nations of the Grand River reserve in Ontario, Canada. He was educated at the Mohawk Institute Residential School and learned to speak English, Onondaga, and Mohawk. Newhouse grew up as a member of the Plymouth Brethren.

== Career ==
Newhouse followed the Longhouse Religion as an adult and managed a farm near the Grand River that his father had owned. By the 1870s he had become a prominent member of the Haudenosaunee Confederacy and was a member of the tribe's council in 1875 and 1883-1883. Newhouse primarily focused on learning and preserving the traditional knowledge of the Haudenosaunee. In the mid-1870s he was involved in petitioning David Laird for the confederacy to be recognized as a legal entity. In the two decades that followed, Newhouse was involved in disputes over land along the Grand River, known as the Haldimand Tract. He also participated in the Six Nations Union Association in the early 1880s, and continued to advocate that the Six Nations should be allowed to govern themselves, being involved with numerous petitions, though he was not a chief of the people after 1884. In 1885 he arranged a manuscript version of the Great Law of Peace, which has been analyzed since, particularly for its faithfulness to the original. Despite Newhouse's efforts, it was never formally endorsed by the Grand River Council.

Some information preserved by Newhouse and others was published in 1916 in the New York State Museum bulletin.

He died on 11 June 1921.
