= Great Law of Peace =

Oral constitution of the Haudenosaunee Confederacy

Hiawatha Belt, visual symbol of the Great Law of Peace

The Great Law of Peace, (Note: Mohawk: Kaianereʼkó꞉wa or Kayanerenkó:wa; Oneida: Kayanlaˀ Kówa or kayanlʌhslaˀkó; Onondaga: Gaya·nę·hsä·ʼgó·nah or Gaya·neñ·hsä·ʼgó·nah; Cayuga: Gayanę̱hsraˀgó꞉wah; Seneca: Gayáneshä́ʼgo꞉wa꞉h) also known as Gayanashagowa, is the oral constitution of the Haudenosaunee Confederacy, established circa 1102 CE among the Five Nations of the Mohawk, Onondaga, Oneida, Cayuga, and Seneca. Conceived by Dekanawidah, known as the Great Peacemaker, and his spokesman Hiawatha, the law was represented by symbols on wampum belts which functioned as mnemonic devices for storytellers. The original five nations ratified this constitution near modern-day Victor, New York, with the sixth nation, the Tuscarora, acceding in 1722.

The Great Law of Peace is presented as part of a narrative noting laws and ceremonies to be performed at prescribed times. The laws, called a constitution, are divided into 117 articles. The nations within the Haudenosaunee Confederacy are symbolized by an eastern white pine tree, called the Tree of Peace. Each nation plays a delineated role in the conduct of The Grand Council. The laws were first recorded and transmitted by means of wampum, shell-bead belts that encoded the message in a sequence of pictograms. In the 19th century, it was translated into English and other languages.

The exact date of the events is not known, but it is thought to date back to the late 12th century (c. 1190).

== Narrative, constitution, and ceremony ==
The narratives of the Great Law exist in the languages of the member nations, so spelling and usages vary. William N. Fenton observed that it came to serve a purpose as a social organization inside and among the nations, a constitution of the Haudenosaunee Confederacy or Iroquois League, ceremonies to be observed, and a binding history of peoples. Fenton also observed some nine common points focusing more simply on the narrative story line, though Christopher Vecsey identified 22 points shared across some two dozen versions of the narrative or parts of the narrative both direct and indirect:

External videos
- " Peacemaker", Historica Canada, Heritage Minutes (1:01 min)

Narrative

1. The Migration and Separation of the People (pre-history of the area)
2. The Birth and Growth of Deganawida
3. The Journey to the Mohawks, the Situation, and the Mission Explained
4. The Mother of Nations Accepts Deganawida's Message
5. The Cannibal Converts
6. The Prophets Prove Their Power
7. Tadadaho the Wizard Prevents Peace
8. Hiawatha's Relatives Are Killed
9. Hiawatha Mourns and Quits Onondaga
10. Hiawatha Invents Wampum
11. Hiawatha Gives the Mohawks Lessons in Protocol
12. Deganawida Consoles Hiawatha
13. Scouts Travel to Tadadaho
14. Deganawida and Hiawatha Join Oneidas, Cayugas, and Senecas to Mohawks
15. The Nations March to Tadadaho, Singing the Peace Hymn
16. Deganawida and Hiawatha Transform Tadadaho

Constitution of the Confederacy and social order of the member peoples

1. Deganawida and Hiawatha Establish Haudenosaunee Unity and Law
2. Deganawida and Hiawatha Establish League Chiefs and Council Polity
3. The Confederacy Takes Symbolic Images
4. The League Declares Its Sovereignty (the Constitutional laws of the Confederacy)

Ceremony

1. The Condolence Maintains the Confederacy (a sequence of ceremonies for grieving over a deceased chief and appointing a new one)
2. Deganawida Departs

Barbara Mann has gathered versions featuring conflicting but harmonized elements (who does what varies, but what happens is more consistent than not), or stories that tell distinct elements not shared in other versions, into a narrative she includes in the Encyclopedia of the Haudenosaunee published in 2000.

== Published accounts ==
=== Cayuga ===
An untranslated version has been posted by the Smithsonian Institution. Another is mentioned being presented to Michael Foster.

=== Mohawk ===
Several Mohawk-language versions of the law were printed, and several of those were printed more than once. Horatio Hale published one in 1883 he traced somewhat earlier which was reprinted by William N. Fenton, following Arthur Caswell Parker, in 1968. J. N. B. Hewitt published one in 1928 based on a much earlier fragment. Joseph Brant and John Norton commented on details of the narrative as early as 1801 and published since. Dayodekane, better known as Seth Newhouse, arranged for some versions that were published differently near 1900 - first from 1885 included in a book by Paul A. W. Wallace in 1948, and a second version published in 1910 by Arthur C. Parker. Fenton discusses Newhouse' contributions in a paper in 1949. Wallace also published a separate book without stating his source in 1946 called The Iroquois book of Life - White Roots of Peace, which was later revised and extended with endorsements by Haundenosaunee chiefs and historian John Mohawk (Seneca) in 1986 and 1994.

=== Oneida ===
Oneida versions have been noted in various places. One from New York, has been echoed/summarized by the Milwaukee Public Museum. Another has been published by the Oneida Nation of Wisconsin in two sections. Another account is also reported.

=== Onondaga ===
Parts of Horatio Hale's work The Iroquois Book of Rites is said to have Onondaga sources. J. N. B. Hewitt recorded Chief John Buck and included his presentation in 1892. John Arthur Gibson shared several versions that have gathered notable awareness among scholars like Fenton and others. His first version was in 1899. Gibson then participated in a collective version with many Chiefs from the Six Nations of the Grand River Reserve in 1900 which was reprinted a number of times: first in 1910/1, and then included in another work. A final version was offered to Alexander Goldenweiser but was not finished, translated and published until 1992 by Hanni Woodbury.

=== Seneca ===
Newspaper editor William Walker Canfield published a book The Legends of the Iroquois in 1902 based on found notes he was given purporting to be written from comments of Cornplanter reportedly to an employee of the surveyor company Holland Land Company, perhaps John Adlum, known friend of Cornplanter. It is the primary source of the mention of a solar eclipse. Another Seneca version was given by Deloe B. Kittle to Parker and was published in 1923.

=== Tuscarora ===
The Tuscarora joined the Haudenosaunee Confederacy in 1722. There is a version of the Great Law of Peace attributed by Wallace "Mad Bear" Anderson of the Tuscarora published in 1987. However, there is a claim this was borrowed.

== Evaluation ==
According to Haudenosaunee tradition, the Great Law of Peace ended the ancient cycle of enmity and continuous conflict between the separate tribes and united them into the Haudenosaunee Confederacy. Early anthropologist Lewis H. Morgan likewise attributed the regional dominance achieved by the Haudenosaunee to their superior organization and coordination compared to other tribes; George Hunt contended there was a factor of economic determinism, with their need for furs for the European trade and their superior geographic position controlling most of central and western New York.

== Influence on the United States Constitution ==
Americana and Native American Studies Professor Donald Grinde claims that the democratic ideals of the Kaianere’kó:wa provided a significant inspiration to Benjamin Franklin, James Madison and other framers of the U.S. Constitution. He contends that the federal structure of the U.S. Constitution was influenced by the living example of the Iroquois Confederation, as were notions of individual liberty and the separation of powers. Grinde, working with Bruce Johansen, also identifies Native American symbols and imagery that were adopted by the nascent United States, including the American bald eagle and a bundle of arrows. However, eagles and bundles of arrows are common imagery in European heraldry, which is the more likely influence. Their thesis argues the U.S. Constitution was the synthesis of various forms of political organization familiar to the founders, including the Iroquois Confederation. Their thesis led to the U.S. Congress passing Concurrent Resolution 331 to recognize the influence of the Iroquois Constitution upon the American Constitution and Bill of Rights in 1988. John Rutledge of South Carolina, delegate to the Constitutional Convention, read excerpts of various Iroquois Treaties to the drafting committee; however, an English translation of the Great Law of Peace was not created until the 19th century.

The influence of Six Nations law on the U.S. Constitution is disputed by scholars. Haudenosaunee historian Elisabeth J. Tooker has pointed to several differences between the two forms of government, notably that all decisions were made by a consensus of male chiefs who gained their position through a combination of blood descent and selection by female relatives, that representation was on the basis of the number of clans in the group rather than the size or population of the clans, and that the topics discussed were decided by a single tribe. Tooker concluded there is little resemblance between the two documents or reason to believe the Six Nations had a meaningful influence on the American Constitution and that it is unclear how much impact Canassatego's statement at Lancaster actually had on the representatives of the colonies. Stanford University historian Jack N. Rakove argued against any Six Nations influence, pointing to lack of evidence in U.S. constitutional debate records and examples of European antecedents for democratic institutions.

Journalist Charles C. Mann has noted other differences between the Great Law of Peace and the original U.S. Constitution, including the original Constitution's allowing denial of suffrage to women and majority rule rather than consensus. Mann argues that the early colonists' interaction with Native Americans and their understanding of Haudenosaunee government did influence the development of colonial society and culture and the Suffragist movement but stated that "the Constitution as originally enacted was not at all like the Great Law."

Other critics of the Haudenosaunee-influence theory include Samuel Payne, who considered the Haudenosaunee division of powers as seen by Adams as being unlike those in the U.S. Constitution; William Starna and George Hamell, who described errors in Grinde's and Johansen's scholarship, particularly on Canassatego and the Lancaster Treaty; and historian and archaeologist Philip Levy, who also wrote that Grinde and Johansen had misused Adams's material, stating that he was not describing the Iroquois Confederacy government separation of powers and model of government but that he was instead describing England's structure.

== Influence on seven generation sustainability ==
The principle of seven generation sustainability, which states that human decision-making should account as far as the seventh future generation, is often described as originating from the Haudenosaunee Great Law. While accounts of the Great Law describe the importance of making decisions with future generations in mind, there is no specific reference to thinking of seven future generations. Nonetheless, the concept has been described as a tenet of the Great Law and articulated in a Haudenosaunee context by Onondaga Faithkeeper Oren Lyons.

== Example articles ==
§37: There shall be one war chief from each nation, and their duties shall be to carry messages for their chiefs, and to take up arms in case of emergency. They shall not participate in the proceedings of the Council of the League, but shall watch its progress and in case of an erroneous action by a chief, they shall receive the complaints of the people and convey the warnings of the women to him. The people who wish to convey messages to the chiefs of the League shall do so through the war chief of their nation. It shall always be his duty to lay the cases, questions, and propositions of the people before the council of the League.

§58: Any Chief or other person who submits to Laws of a foreign people is alienated and forfeits all claim in the Five Nations.

§101: It shall be the duty of the appointed managers of the Thanksgiving festivals to do all that is needful for carrying out the duties of the occasions. The recognized festivals of Thanksgiving shall be the Midwinter Thanksgiving, the Maple or Sugar-Making Thanksgiving, the Raspberry Thanksgiving, the Strawberry Thanksgiving, the Corn Planting Thanksgiving, the Corn Hoeing Thanksgiving, The Little Festival of Green Corn, the Great Festival of Ripe Corn, and the Complete Thanksgiving for the Harvest. Each nation's festivals shall be held in their Longhouses.

§107: A certain sign shall be known to all the people of the Five Nations which shall denote that the owner or occupant of a house is absent. A stick or pole in a slanting or leaning position shall indicate this and be the sign. Every person not entitled to enter the house by right of living within upon seeing such a sign shall not enter the house by day or by night, but shall keep as far away as his business will permit.

== See also ==
- Firekeeper
- Indigenous law
- Wahkohtowin
