= Seven generation sustainability =

Concept in futurology and ecological stewardship adapted from Haudenosaunee thought

Seven generation stewardship is a concept that urges the current generation of humans to live and work for the benefit of the seventh generation into the future. It is believed to have originated with the Great Law of the Haudenosaunee – which holds appropriate to think seven generations ahead and decide whether the decisions they make today would benefit their descendants. It is frequently associated with the modern, popular concept of environmental stewardship or 'sustainability' but it is much broader in context.

== Haudenosaunee constitution ==
The edict that "In every deliberation, we must consider the impact on the seventh generation" is often attributed to the Haudenosaunee Great Law of Peace, an oral constitution passed on by member nations. However, those words are not contained in written transcriptions of the Constitution of the Haudenosaunee Nation.

The only passage from the text mentioning the number seven talks about qualities that Haudenosaunee leaders should have, while the end of the passage advises them to consider the welfare of future generations. In law 28 of the Constitution of the Haudenosaunee Nation,

We now do crown you with the sacred emblem of the deer's antlers, the emblem of your Lordship. You shall now become a mentor of the people of the Five Nations. The thickness of your skin shall be seven spans — which is to say that you shall be proof against anger, offensive actions, and criticism. [...] Look and listen for the welfare of the whole people and have always in view not only the present but also the coming generations, even those whose faces are yet beneath the surface of the ground -- the unborn of the future Nation.

Oren Lyons, Chief of the Onondaga Nation, writes: "We are looking ahead, as is one of the first mandates given us as chiefs, to make sure and to make every decision that we make relate to the welfare and well-being of the seventh generation to come. ... What about the seventh generation? Where are you taking them? What will they have?"

== Principle ==
In reaction to consumerism, another interpretation that stresses stewardship owed to generations past and future sometimes arises in popular culture and discourse. Rather than pointing to seven generations counted from one's own and looking toward the future, there is an awareness of a legacy to honor or a debt to bear in mind to those three generations before one's own, as well as an awareness of one's own legacy bequeathed to the three generations to follow one's own.By reckoning 25 years per generation, the span of lifetimes stretches 75 years before one's birth and 75 years beyond one's death.

A variation on the seven generation thinking where self is placed at the center is to expand the span of years that touches one's own lifetime. One such variation was proffered by Quaker sociologist Elise M. Boulding. According to this perspective, a person takes into account the oldest relative or family friend who touched or knew the person as an infant; for example, a great-great-grandparent of age 90. In the same way, the person should then consider the oldest relative or family friend who touched or knew that great-great-grandparent; for example, another 90-year-old person. Then the calculation runs forward to the infant whom the person might touch or know during his or her own lifetime; and by extension again, estimate the number of years when that infant might grow to old age and touch or know still another infant. In total this reaching into the past 180 years and into the future 180 results in the widest frame for understanding one's place in the 360 year period over which one may be known and may know others. In other words, the fact of one's own existence materially touches this very wide span of time.

== Contemporary interpretations and applications ==
The seven generations principle continues to inform Indigenous worldviews in the present day, particularly in relation to sustainability, child rights, and intergenerational equity. According to a 2023 peer-reviewed article in the Canadian Journal of Children's Rights, the framework emphasizes long-term thinking and stewardship rooted in the interconnectedness of land, culture, and future generations.

In many Indigenous communities, including the Anishinaabe and Haudenosaunee, the principle is seen as both a responsibility and a rights-based approach that involves children as active participants in decision-making processes affecting their future. This aligns with Article 12 of the United Nations Convention on the Rights of the Child, which supports children's right to be heard in matters affecting them. Scholars argue that threats such as climate change, land dispossession, and the legacy of colonialism have disproportionately affected Indigenous children, severing cultural ties and harming well-being. The Seven Generations framework is increasingly seen not just as a cultural teaching, but also as a strategy for ecological sustainability and child protection.

== See also ==
- Longtermism
- Jetyata
