= Wampum =

Traditional shell bead of the Eastern Woodlands Indigenous tribes of North America

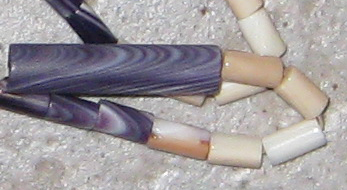
Quahog (left) and whelk (right) wampum

A representation of the original Two Row Wampum treaty belt

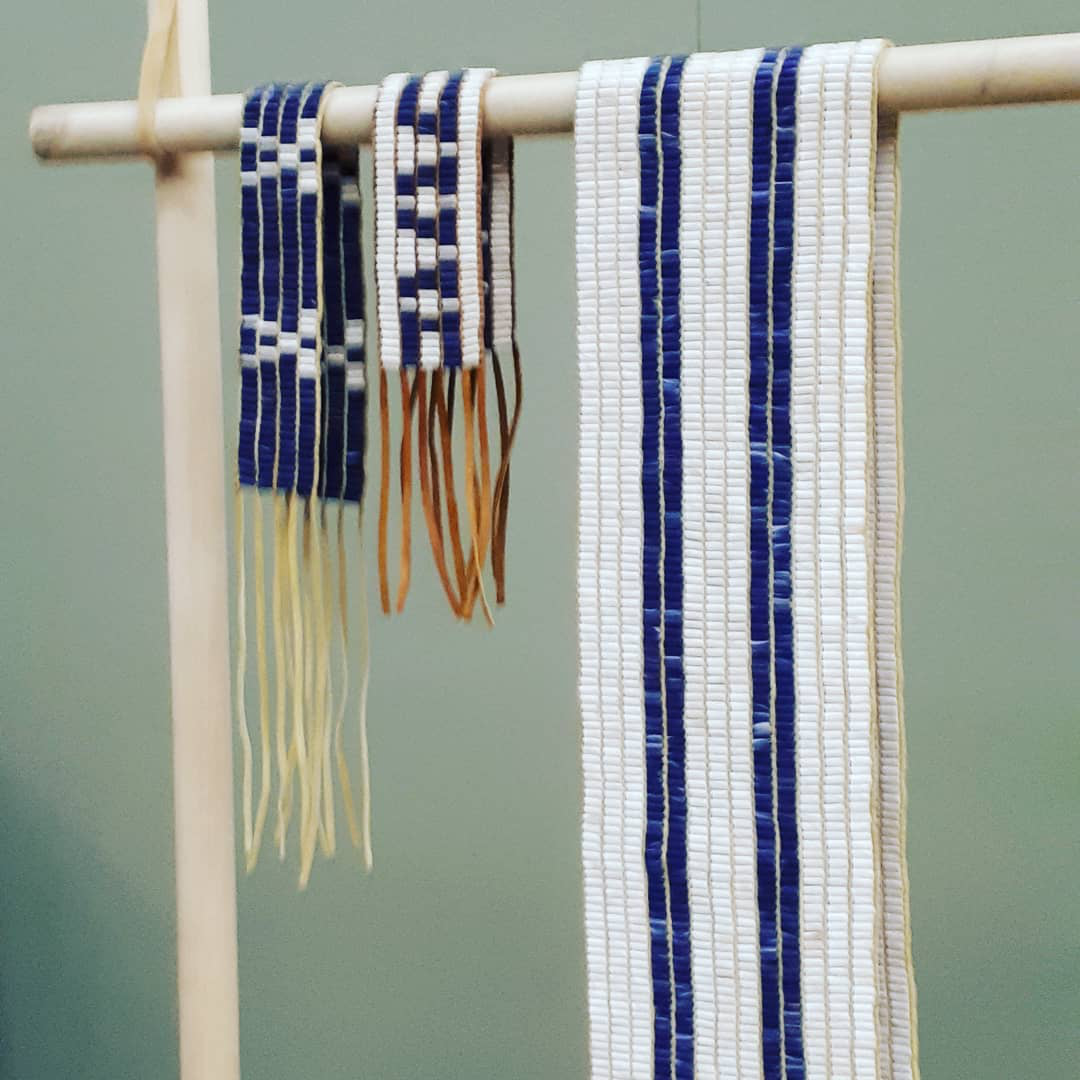
Modern examples and interpretations of wampum

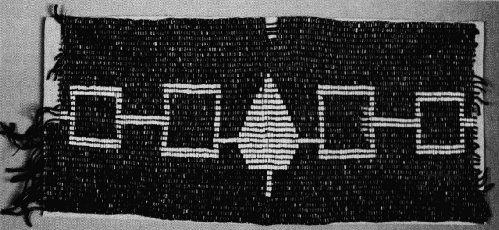
Haudenosaunee wampum belt

Wampum is a traditional shell bead of the Indigenous peoples of the Northeastern Woodlands of North America. The term first referred to white and purple beads made from the quahog, also known as the Western North Atlantic hard-shelled clam, but has expanded to include white shell beads hand-fashioned from the North Atlantic channeled whelk shell.

In New York, wampum beads have been discovered dating from before 1510. Before European contact, strings of wampum were used for storytelling, ceremonial gifts, and recording important treaties and historical events, such as the Two Row Wampum Treaty and the Hiawatha Belt. Chief Joseph Onasakenrat was pictured wearing the Two Dog Wampum and used it to assert Mohawk land claims regarding land title of Lake of Two Mountains, and Oka.

Northeastern Indigenous tribes also used wampum as a means of exchange, strung together in lengths for convenience. The process to make wampum was labor-intensive with stone tools. The coastal tribes had sufficient access to the basic shells to make wampum. These factors increased its scarcity and consequent value among the early European traders, who understood it as a currency and adopted it as such in trading with them.

Wampum artists continue to weave belts of a historical nature, as well as designing new belts or jewelry based on their own concepts.

== Linguistic origin ==
The term wampum is a shortening of wampumpeag, which is derived from the Massachusett or Narragansett word meaning "white strings of shell beads". The Proto-Algonquian reconstructed form is thought to be (wa·p-a·py-aki), "white strings".

The term wampum (or wampumpeag) initially referred only to the white beads which are made of the inner spiral or columella of the channeled whelk shell Busycotypus canaliculatus or Busycotypus carica. Sewant or suckauhock beads are the black or purple shell beads made from the quahog or poquahock clamshell Mercenaria mercenaria. Sewant or zeewant was the term used for this currency by the New Netherland colonists. Common terms for the dark and white beads are wampi (white and yellowish) and saki (dark). The Lenape name for Long Island is Sewanacky, reflecting its connection to the dark wampum.

== Description and manufacture ==
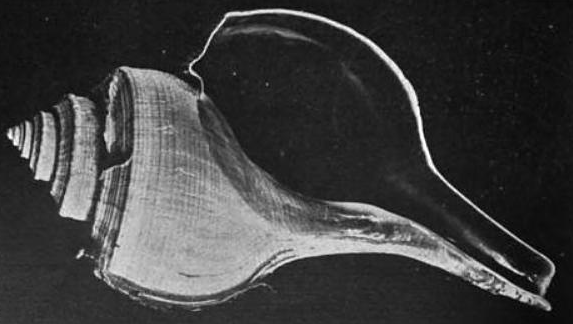
The white beads are made from the inner spiral of the channeled whelk shell.

Wampum beads are typically tubular in shape, often a quarter of an inch long and an eighth of an inch wide. One 17th-century Seneca wampum belt featured beads almost 2.5 inches (65 mm) long. Women artisans traditionally made wampum beads by rounding small pieces of whelk shells, then piercing them with a hole before stringing them. Wooden pump drills with quartz drill bits and steatite weights were used to drill the shells. The unfinished beads would be strung together and rolled on a grinding stone with water and sand until they were smooth. The beads would be strung or woven on deer hide thongs, sinew, milkweed bast, or basswood fibers.

The introduction of European metal tools revolutionized the production of wampum, and by the mid-seventeenth century, production numbered in the tens of millions of beads. Dutch colonists discovered the importance of wampum as a means of exchange between tribes, and they began mass-producing it in workshops. John Campbell established such a factory in Passaic, New Jersey, which manufactured wampum into the early 20th century. Eventually the primary source of wampum was that manufactured by colonists, a market glutted by the Dutch.

== Uses ==
=== Record-keeping and memory aids ===
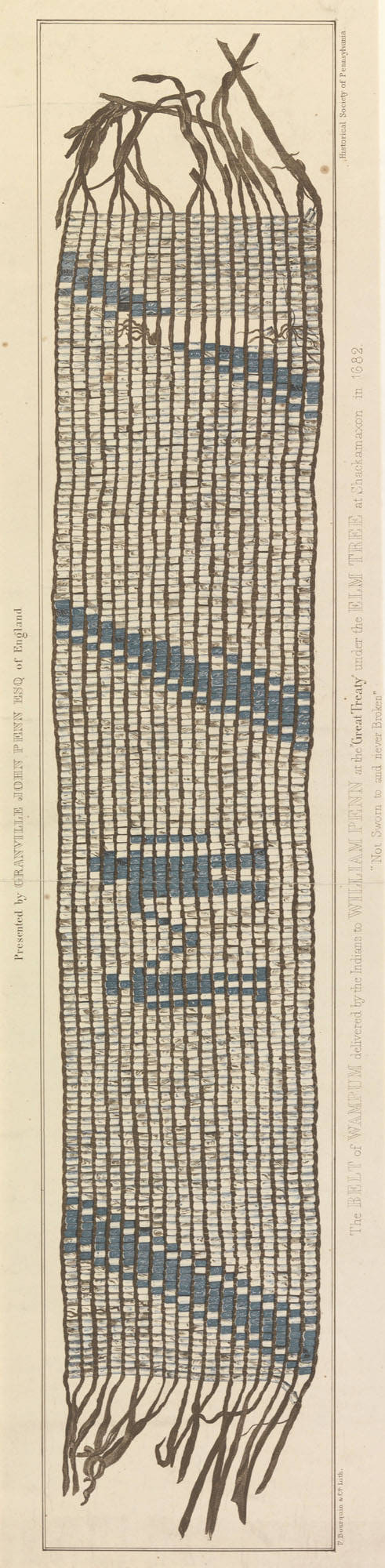
Lithograph of wampum belt given to William Penn at the "Great Treaty" in 1682

As William James Sidis wrote in his 1935 history:

The weaving of wampum belts is a sort of writing by means of belts of colored beads, in which the various designs of beads denoted different ideas according to a definitely accepted system, which could be read by anyone acquainted with wampum language, irrespective of what the spoken language is. Records and treaties are kept in this manner, and individuals could write letters to one another in this way.

Wampum belts were used as a memory aid in oral tradition, and were sometimes used as badges of office or as ceremonial devices in Indigenous cultures, such as the Haudenosaunee. For example, the 1820 New Monthly Magazine reports on a speech given by the late chief Tecumseh in which he vehemently gesticulated to a belt as he pointed out treaties made 20 years earlier and battles fought since then.

=== Social purposes ===
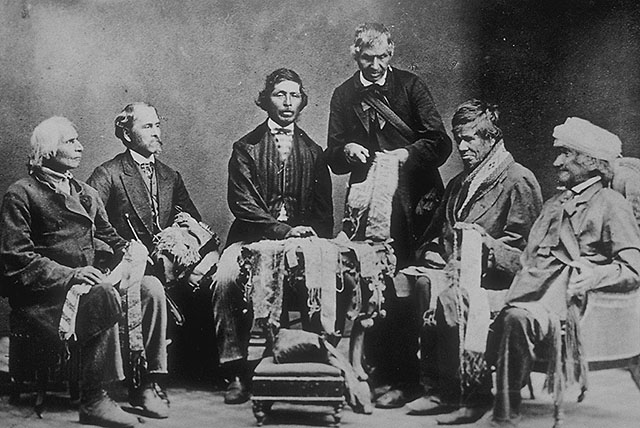
Iroquois Chiefs from the Six Nations Reserve reading Wampum belts in Brantford, Ontario, in 1871

Wampum strings may be presented as a formal affirmation of cooperation or friendship between groups, or as an invitation to a meeting. In his study on the origins of money, anthropologist David Graeber placed wampum as it was used by indigenous peoples of the Northeastern Woodlands before European colonization in a category of things with symbolic cultural value that were "mainly used to rearrange relations between people" rather than being used in exchanges of everyday items.

The Haudenosaunee (Iroquois) used wampum as a person's credentials or a certificate of authority. It was also used for official purposes and religious ceremonies, and as a way to bind peace between tribes. Among the Haudenosaunee, every chief and every clan mother has a certain string of wampum that serves as their certificate of office. When they pass on or are removed from their station, the string will then pass on to the new leader. Runners carrying messages during colonial times would present the wampum showing that they had the authority to carry the message.

As a method of recording and an aid in narrating, Haudenosaunee warriors with exceptional skills were provided training in interpreting the wampum belts. As the Keepers of the Central Fire, the Onondaga Nation was also trusted with the task of keeping all wampum records. Wampum is still used in the ceremony of raising up a new chief and in the Haudenosaunee Thanksgiving ceremonies.

Wampum was central to the giving of names, in which the names and titles of deceased persons were passed on to others. Deceased individuals of high office are quickly replaced, and a wampum inscribed with the name of the deceased is laid on the shoulders of the successor, who may shake it off and reject the transfer of name. The reception of a name may also transfer personal history and previous obligations of the deceased (e.g., the successor of a person killed in war may be obligated to avenge the death of the name's previous holder, or care for the deceased person's family as their own).

... the Iroquoians (Five Nations and Huron alike) shared a very particular constitution: they saw their societies not as a collection of living individuals but as a collection of eternal names, which over the course of times passed from one individual holder to another.

Just as the wampum enabled the continuation of names and the histories of persons, the wampum was central to establishing and renewing peace between clans and families. When a man representing his respective social unit met another, he would offer one wampum inscribed with mnemonic symbols representing the purpose of the meeting or message. The wampum, thus, facilitated the most essential practices in holding the Iroquois society together.

=== Currency ===
When Europeans came to the Americas, they adopted wampum as money to trade with the native peoples of New England and New York. Wampum was legal tender in New England from 1637 to 1661. It continued as currency in New York until 1673 at the rate of eight white or four black wampum equalling one stuiver, meaning that the white had the same value as the copper duit coin. The colonial government in New Jersey issued a proclamation setting the rate at six white or three black to one penny; this proclamation also applied in Delaware. The black shells were rarer than the white shells and so were worth more, which led people to dye the white and dilute the value of black shells.

In the writings of Robert Beverley Jr. of Virginia Colony about tribes in Virginia in 1705, he described peak as referring to the white shell bead, valued at 9 pence a yard, and wampom peak as denoting the more expensive dark purple shell bead, at the rate of 1 shilling and 6 pence (18 pence) per yard. He added that these polished shells with drilled holes were made from the cunk (conch), while another currency of lesser value called roenoke was fashioned from the cockleshell.

Wampum briefly became legal tender in North Carolina in 1710, but its use as common currency died out in New York by the early 18th century.

The use of wampum as currency spans back to 1622, when the Dutch implemented it into their trade. After the introduction of wampum into European currency, the European colonists quickly began trying to amass large quantities of this currency, and shifting control of this currency determined which power would have control of the European-Indigenous trade. The wampum's significance to the tribes that collected it meant that no one individual wanted to amass too much of it, however, European colonists did not care about its cultural significance, but it would always hold value to the indigenous populations. In this way, colonists could trade wampum for goods and sell those goods to Europeans for European currencies, therefore amassing wealth. This is one of the few examples of settler adaptation of indigenous practices for trade with indigenous people and also amongst themselves. However, the conversion of wampum to European currencies and the introduction of a monetary system was not something that the indigenous people had a desire to take part in, thus increasing tensions as trades held different economic value to each contributing party. However, when wampum was legal tender, it was one of the most important forms of currency in the region amongst settlers as well as between settlers and indigenous groups.

== Mass production and mechanization ==
As early as the late 16th century, some shell beads from modern day New York showed signs of metal tool work. By the end of the 17th century, virtually all new wampum was produced using metal tools, and by the 18th century, glass beads had become predominant. The increased availability of wampum was linked to mass production efforts by Long Island tribes, who utilized metal tools obtained from Europeans to produce large quantities of beads for trade.

In the 18th century, Dutch colonists in the Hudson Valley established small-scale wampum manufacturing operations to supplement scarce coinage and facilitate trade. In 1746, the Campbell family established a wampum factory at Pascack (now Park Ridge) in New Jersey. Their operation supplied beads to the fur trade and government agencies. As demand increased in the early 19th century, the Campbells adopted mechanization to improve efficiency. During the peak years from 1835 to 1866, the Campbell family alone produced around one million black beads annually.

The mass production and European involvement in wampum manufacturing contributed to widespread circulation but eventual devaluation. By the 19th century, glass paste beads produced in European workshops added to the confusion and effectively led to the disappearance of older, traditional wampum as a medium of exchange.

== Repatriation ==
In 1989, the National Museum of the American Indian repatriated eleven wampum belts to Haudenosaunee chiefs at the Onondaga Longhouse Six Nations Reserve in New York. These belts dated to the late 18th century and are sacred to the Longhouse religion. They had been away from their tribes for over a century.

In 2017, a wampum belt purchased by Frank Speck in 1913 was returned to Kanesatake, where it is used in cultural and political events.

== Contemporary wampum ==
The Seneca Nation commissioned replicas of five historic wampum belts completed in 2008. The belts were made by Lydia Chavez (Unkechaug/Blood) and made with beads manufactured on the Unkechaug Indian Nation Territory on Long Island, New York.

The Shinnecock Indian Nation has sought to preserve a traditional wampum manufacturing site called Ayeuonganit Wampum Ayimꝏup (Here, Wampum Was Made). A portion of the original site, Lot 24 in today's Parrish Pond subdivision in Southampton, Long Island, has been reserved for parkland.

The state-recognized Unkechaug Nation on Long Island, New York, has built a wampum factory which manufactures traditional as well as contemporary beads for use by Native artists such as Ken Maracle, Elizabeth Perry, and Lydia Chavez in their designs of traditional belts and contemporary jewelry. The factory has been in existence since 1998 and has been instrumental in the resurrection of the use of wampum in contemporary Native life.

Contemporary wampum makers who used traditional methods include Julius Cook, Sakaronkiokeweh (Mohawk) (1927–1999) was a wampum maker who used traditional methods. and Ken Maracle, Haohyoh (Cayuga), a faith keeper of the Lower Cayuga Longhouse.

== See also ==
- Economy of the Haudenosaunee
- Flag of the Haudenosaunee (Iroquois) Confederacy
- Great Law of Peace
- Hiawatha Belt
- History of money
- Quipu, Quechua recording devices made of knotting and dyed strings
- Shell money
