= Great Peacemaker =

Native American prophet who founded the Haudenosaunee Confederacy

- Skén:nen rahá:wi or Tekanawí:ta: Honǫhsoní:dǫh / Deganawí:daˀ (Cayuga); Deganöwi:dah (Seneca)
- Born: 12th century (or 15th century); Wendake, Kanièn꞉ke, or Onoñdá’geh
- Died: 12th century (or 15th century); Haudenosauneega
- Known for: Cofounder of the Haudenosaunee Confederacy and peacemaker

The Great Peacemaker, (Note: Mohawk: Skén:nen rahá:wi [ˈskʌ̃ː.nʌ̃ ɾa.ˈhaː.wi]; Cayuga: Honǫhsoní:dǫh, lit. 'he strengthens the Longhouse') sometimes referred to by his name Deganawida, (Note: Mohawk: Tekanawí:ta [de.ga.na.ˈwiː.da]; Cayuga: Deganawí:daˀ; Seneca: Deganöwi:dah) (Note: As a mark of respect, some Haudenosaunee avoid using his personal name except in special circumstances.) was an Indigenous prophet and founder of the Haudenosaunee Confederacy (or Iroquois League) according to Haudenosaunee oral tradition. Along with Jigonhsasee and Hiawatha, he was a central figure in the promulgation of the Great Law of Peace and development of the Haudenosaunee Grand Council, unifying the five nations of the Mohawk, Oneida, Onondaga, Cayuga, and Seneca.

== Background ==
The Great Peacemaker's name, Deganawida, means 'Two River Currents Flowing Together'. Some of the numerous legends about the Great Peacemaker have conflicting information. It is reported that he was born a Huron, and by some accounts, his mother was a virgin, making the birth miraculous. Others say he was born an Onondaga and later adopted by the Mohawk. The Onondaga name the Peacemaker's mother as Gahę·déhsųk, his maternal grandmother as Gahę·dóʼkthaʼ, and his birthplace as Gaha·ná·yęʼ (transl. Forks Lying), an unknown location.

Arthur C. Parker's book The Constitution of the Five Nations describes how the Great Peacemaker travelled to different settlements to spread his message of peace. At one settlement, when asked who he was, the Great Peacemaker answered, "I am the man who is called on earth by the name of Dekanahwideh, and I have just come from the west and am now going east for the purpose of propagating peace so that the shedding of human blood might cease among you." When the settlement agreed to his plan, he explained, "This day is early and yet young, so is the new mind also tender and young, so also is the Good Tidings of Peace and Power, and as the new sun of Good Tidings of Peace and Power arose, so it will proceed on its course and prosper; so also will the young mind, and the Good Tidings of Peace and Power shall prevail and prosper. Therefore in the future, your grandchildren forever shall live in peace."

== Formation of the Haudenosaunee Confederacy ==
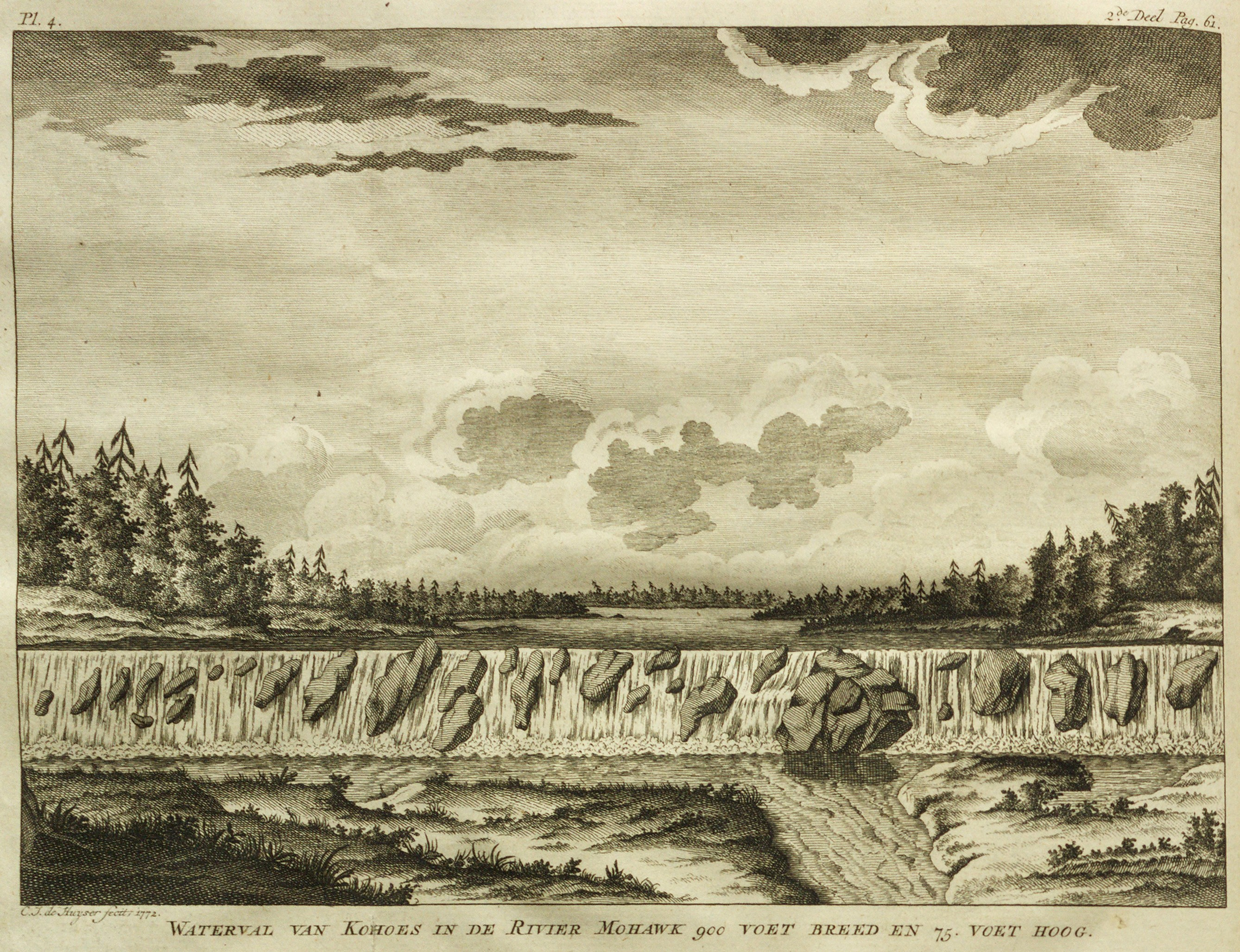
Cohoes Falls in the 18th century AD by Pehr Kalm.

By all accounts, the Great Peacemaker was a prophet who counseled peace among the warring tribes. According to some legends his first ally was Jigonhsasee, who became known as the Mother of Nations. She lent her home for the meeting of the leaders of the rival tribal nations. The Great Peacemaker's follower Hiawatha, an Onondaga renowned for his oratory, helped him achieve his vision of bringing the tribes together in peace.

According to the archaeologist Dean Snow, the Great Peacemaker converted Hiawatha in the territory of the Onondaga; he traveled alone to visit the Mohawk tribe who lived near what is now Cohoes, New York. Other traditional accounts hold that the Great Peacemaker consulted with Jigonhsasee about which tribal leaders to approach and she facilitated that meeting to create the confederacy.

According to some legends, initially the Mohawk rejected the message of the Great Peacemaker, so he decided to perform a feat to demonstrate his purity and spiritual power. After climbing a tree high above Kahon:ios (Cohoes Falls), the Great Peacemaker told the Mohawk warriors to chop the tree down. Many onlookers watched as the Great Peacemaker disappeared into the swirling rapids of the Mohawk River. They believed he had died but the next morning they found him sitting near a campfire. Greatly impressed by the Great Peacemaker's miraculous survival, the Mohawk became the founding tribe of the Haudenosaunee Confederacy.

On his travels to bring the warring Nations together, the Peacemaker spoke only of peace, friendship, and unity. As Barbara Graymont states, "Dekanawida's ideas and actions were noticeably separating him from his people. The Wyandot could not understand a man who loved peace more than war." The Great Peace associated with Dekanawida came with three parts

- The Good Word, which is righteousness in action, bringing justice for all.
- Health, which is a sound mind in a sound body, bringing peace on Earth.
- Power, which is the establishment of civil authority, bringing with it the increase in spiritual power in keeping with the will of the Master of Life.

=== Great Law of Peace ===
While the Mohawk, Oneida, Cayuga, and Seneca accepted the Great Law, the Onondaga, ruled by the evil sorcerer Tadodaho, initially refused. With Jigonhsasee and Hiawatha, the Peacemaker freed the Onondaga leader of the evil that tormented him, naming him as the Chief of Chiefs of the Grand Council of the Haudenosaunee. The five nations gathered at Onondaga Lake, where they planted a Tree of Peace, buried their weapons beneath it, and proclaimed the Great Binding Law of the Haudenosaunee Confederacy.

The Peacemaker established a council of clan and village chiefs to govern the confederacy. In each nation, which had matrilineal kinship systems of descent and property-holding, power was shared between the sexes. The Peacemaker gave Jigonhsasee the task of assigning the men to different positions within the Grand Council, and to women in the future the power to choose the chiefs of the longhouse. He called her Mother of Nations, as she was the first ally of his peace movement, and she became the head Clan Mother of the Haudenosaunee. Men held the positions of the rotiyanehson (hereditary chiefs) through their mother's line; clan mothers ruled on the fitness of chiefs and could depose any that they opposed. Most decisions in council were made by consensus, to which each representative had an equal voice.

== Prophecy of the Boy Seer ==
Speaking in 1959, Tuscarora activist Wallace Anderson (Mad Bear) described a prophecy attributed to the Great Peacemaker. After the formation of the Confederacy, the Peacemaker foretold that a "white serpent" would come to his people's lands and make friends with them, only to deceive them later. A "red serpent" would later make war against the "white serpent", but a Native American boy would be given a great power. He would be accepted as a chosen leader by the people of "the land of the hilly country." The boy stays neutral in the fight, and he speaks to the people, who number as the blades of grass, but he is heard by all. After a season, a "black serpent" would come and defeat both the "white" and "red serpents". According to the prophecy, when the people gathered under the elm tree become humble, all three "serpents" would be blinded by a light many times brighter than the sun. Deganawidah said that he would be that light. He would return to his people and his nation would accept the "white serpent" into their safekeeping like a long-lost brother.

== Other traditions ==
The Mackinac natives record that Hiawatha came to Mackinaw Island to see Giche Mantitou Rock, also known as "Sugarloaf Rock", where Peacemaker taught as well as references that Peacemaker walked upon Lake Ontario. It is additionally recorded by them that Peacemaker's canoe could fly, including a story where Peacemaker stated to Hiawatha, "this canoe can be rowed across these waters or do you want it to see it fly across". He traveled through the narrow neck of land near Niagara Falls healing the sick and all that he touched.

== Dates ==
The dates Dekanawida lived, and thus the founding of the Confederacy, have not been identified with certainty.

Historians and archeologists have researched an incident related in the oral history of the founding of the Confederacy. As recorded by later scholars, one account relates there was a violent conflict among the Seneca, who were the last Haudenosaunee nation to join the confederacy as a founding member. Their violence stopped when the sun darkened and the day seemed to turn to night. Since 1902 scholars have studied the possibility that this event was a solar eclipse, as William Canfield suggested in his Legends of the Iroquois; told by "the Cornplanter" . As scholars have learned more about the representation of natural events in oral histories, scholars into the 21st century have noted eclipses that could serve to date the founding of the Confederacy, in addition to the archeological evidence. Scholars referring to an eclipse have included (chronologically): Paul A. W. Wallace, Elizabeth Tooker, Bruce E. Johansen, Dean R. Snow, Barbara A. Mann and Jerry L. Fields, William N. Fenton, David Henige, Gary Warrick, and Neta Crawford.

Since Canfield's first mention, and the majority view, scholars have widely supported a date of 1451 AD as being of a known solar eclipse and the likely founding date based on this oral account and other evidence. Some argue it is an insufficient fit for the description, and favor a date of 1142, when there was also a documented solar eclipse. A few question dating the founding of the confederacy based on the mention of the eclipse.

Archeological investigation has contributed to discussions about the founding date, as its evidence can be dated and correlated to natural events. In 1982 archeologist Dean Snow said that evidence from mainstream archeology did not support a founding of the confederacy for any dates of an eclipse before 1350 AD (thus ruling out the 1142 AD date.) By 1998 Fenton considered an eclipse earlier than the 1451 AD majority view unlikely, but possible as long as it was after 1000 AD. By 2007/8 reviews considered an 1142 AD eclipse as a possible point of reference, even if most scholars supported 1451 AD as the safe choice.

== Legacy ==
The Peacemaker continues to be revered by Haudenosaunee people as a founding father of the Haudenosaunee Confederacy.

=== Influence on the United States constitution ===
This confederacy influenced the United States Constitution and Anglo-American ideas of democracy, as recognized by Concurrent Resolution 331 issued by the U. S. Congress in 1988, which states in part:

Whereas the original framers of the Constitution, including, most notably, George Washington and Benjamin Franklin, are known to have greatly admired the concepts of the Six Nations of the Iroquois Confederacy; Whereas the confederation of the original Thirteen Colonies into one republic was influenced by the political system developed by the Iroquois Confederacy as were many of the democratic principles which were incorporated into the Constitution itself...

=== In the Baháʼí Faith ===
Some members of the Baháʼí Faith have connected the signs of a Prophet, as described by Baháʼu'lláh (Prophet-founder of the Baháʼí Faith), with the Peacemaker. As such, many Native American Baháʼís in North America (and some non-Native) revere the Peacemaker as a Manifestation of God.

== In film ==
- Kissed by Lightning, 2009 film by Shelley Niro

== See also ==
- List of peace activists
