= Onondaga Nation =

Federally recognized Indigenous nation in New York

Onondaga Nation of New York Onoñdaʼgegáʼ (Onondaga)
- Logo
- Capital: Onondaga; 42°56′31″N 76°9′21″W
- Official languages: Onondaga
- Recognised national languages: English
- Ethnic groups: Onondaga people
- Government: Consensus government
  - Tadodaho: Sid Hill
- Legislature: Onondaga Council

Domestic dependent nation
  - Treaty of Canandaigua: November 11, 1794

Population
  - Estimate: Unknown
- Time zone: EST

The Onondaga Nation (/ˌɒnənˈdɔːɡə/; Onondaga: Onoñdaʼgegáʼ, 'People of the Hills') is a federally recognized nation of Onondaga people in the State of New York. They control the Onondaga Reservation (Onoñ·dá’geh) south of the city of Syracuse.

== History ==
In the American Revolutionary War, the Onondaga were at first officially neutral, although individual Onondaga warriors were involved in at least one raid on American settlements. After Americans attacked their main village on April 20, 1779, the Onondaga later sided with the majority of the League and fought against the American colonists in alliance with the British. In 1779, George Washington ordered the termination of the Onondaga people, in an operation known as the Sullivan Expedition, breaking the neutrality agreement and devastating the Onondaga people. When the United States won independence, many Onondaga followed Joseph Brant to Upper Canada, where they were given land by the British Crown at Six Nations.

In the aftermath of the Sullivan Expedition, following the brutal winter of 1780, there was a massive swarm of periodical cicadas, which emerge from underground every seventeen years. The sudden arrival of such a large quantity of the insects provided a source of sustenance for the Onondaga people who were experiencing severe food insecurity following the Sullivan campaigns and the subsequent brutal winter. The seemingly miraculous arrival of the cicadas (specifically, Brood VII also known as the Onondaga brood) is commemorated by the Onondaga as an intervention by the Creator to ensure their survival after such a traumatizing, catastrophic event.

On November 11, 1794, the Onondaga Nation, along with the other Haudenosaunee nations, signed the Treaty of Canandaigua with the United States, in which their right to their homeland was acknowledged by the United States in article II of the treaty.

In 1816, 450 Onondaga were living in New York, 210 of whom lived on Buffalo Creek Reservation.

Through the 19th and early 20th century, the Onondaga faced repeated attempts at assimilation to American culture. In 1850, a school was built along the border of Onondaga, but was burnt down. A second school was built in 1890, teaching exclusively in the English language. In 1892, the Haudenosaunee protested allotment under the Dawes Act and in 1924 the Indian Citizenship Act, which they saw as infringing on their rights as a sovereign nation and contradicting the Two Row Wampum Treaty. They continued to oppose the Indian Reorganization Act in 1935.

Leon Shenandoah was condoled as Tadodaho in 1968. The 1970s saw a number of sovereignty wins for the Nation, including court victories against New York State on jurisdictional sovereignty, Onondaga language education on the reservation, and the introduction of the Haudenosaunee passport. The Iroquois Nationals were formed at Onondaga in 1980. Between 1989 and 1998, a number of historic wampum belts and ceremonial masks were returned to the Nation by New York museums.

After Shenandoah's death in 1996, Sid Hill was condoled as Tadodaho in 2002. The Onondaga brought a land claim against the State of New York in 2005, claiming land ownership over 4,000 square miles (10,000 km^{2}) in Upstate New York. The claim was rejected in federal court in 2010, with the ruling citing potential disruption to non-Onondaga residents. The Nation responded by bringing a suit against the United States to the Inter-American Commission on Human Rights, which granted the right to pursue two of its claims in 2023.

Simultaneously, the Nation has involved itself in the restoration of Onondaga Lake with the aim of restoring the health of the water body. In 2022, following an agreement between the Onondaga Nation, New York State, and the federal government over 1,000 acres of former Honeywell land around the headwaters of Onondaga Creek were returned to the Nation.

== Government ==
Tadodaho Sid Hill at the opening ceremony of the 2022 United Nations Biodiversity Conference

The Onondaga Nation is governed by the Onondaga Council, the traditional government of the Onondaga people. Fourteen Onondaga Hoyá·neh (traditional hereditary chiefs) and their Clan Mothers act as leaders, caretakers, and diplomats of the Nation. Unlike many other Haudenosaunee nations, the Onondaga Nation has not adopted a republican form of government.

The Onondaga Nation does not consider itself part of the United States and refuses to participate in the United States Census. The Nation does not pay income, sales, or excise taxes to New York State or to the federal government of the United States, nor does it receive any of the benefits paid for by these taxes.

== Land ==
The Onondaga Nation controls the Onondaga Reservation of New York.

On March 11, 2005, the Onondaga Nation in the town of Onondaga, New York, filed a land rights action in federal court, seeking acknowledgment of title to over 3,000 square miles (7,800 km^{2}) of ancestral lands centering in Syracuse, New York. They hoped to obtain increased influence over environmental restoration efforts at Onondaga Lake and other EPA Superfund sites in the claimed area. The Court of Appeals for the Second Circuit rejected the Onondagas' claim in 2012, and the Supreme Court in 2013 declined to hear an appeal.

On June 29, 2022, it was announced that 1,023 acres of land were to be returned to the Onondaga Nation. The land transfer took effect on September 30, 2024.

== Notable people ==
- Leon Shenandoah (Thadodá·hoʼ, 1915–1996), Tadodaho
- Oren Lyons (Joagquisho, born 1930), traditionalist, orator, artist, and athlete
- Dinah John (Ta-wah-ta-whe·jah·quah, c. 1774–1883), supercentenarian
- Sid Hill (Thadodá·hoʼ), Tadodaho
- Samuel George (Honoñwiyéhdih, 'Hononwirehdonh' or 'Great Wolf', 1795–1873), chief from 1850 to 1873
- Lyle Thompson (Deyhahsanoondey, born 1992), professional lacrosse player
- Tonya Gonnella Frichner (1947–2015), lawyer and activist
- Eric Gansworth (born 1965), poet, novelist, and visual artist
- Alfred Warner Jacques (1949–2023), craftsman of traditional wooden lacrosse sticks, American lacrosse player
