= Leon Shenandoah =

Onondaga politician (1915–1996)

- Thadodá·hoʼ

Thadodá·hoʼ
- In office December 7, 1968 – July 22, 1996
- Preceded by: George A. Thomas
- Succeeded by: Sidney Hill

Personal details
- Born: May 18, 1915 Hemlock Creek, New York
- Died: July 22, 1996 (aged 81)
- Citizenship: Haudenosaunee
- Spouse: Thelma Shenandoah
- Children: 7
- Relatives: Edward Shenandoah (brother); Alice Papineau (sister); Phoebe Hill (sister)

Leon Shenandoah (Note: A 1969 Sacramento Bee article states his so-called "Indian name" to be "Ky-you-ha-ha-de", supposedly meaning unfinished business. Zeisberger's Indian dictionary, however, translates "unfinished" to "áchsonti jechsai" and "business" to "garrichwa, agojotechsera", so the accuracy of this claim is questionable.) (May 18, 1915 – July 22, 1996) was an Onondaga politician who headed the Haudenosaunee (Iroquois) Confederacy from 1968 (Note: Many obituaries cite 1969 as the year of his becoming Tadodaho, and one cites it to be 1967, but December 7, 1968, is specifically agreed upon by multiple sources. He was also already Tadodaho by the time of a Washington Post Article on December 10, 1968.) to his death.

Leon Shenandoah was born on May 18, 1915, in a cabin on Hemlock Creek, New York. He belonged to the Eel Clan of the Onondaga.

On December 7, 1968, Shenandoah became the 235th Tadodaho of the Haudenosaunee Confederacy. As Tadodaho, he led the resurgence of the Longhouse Religion among the Haudenosaunee, and he was a great proponent of Onondaga and Haudenosaunee self-rule. On October 24, 1985, he delivered a speech before the United Nations General Assembly in which he compared the United Nations to the Haudenosaunee Confederacy, and in 1992, he represented the Haudenosaunee at the World Conference on Indigenous Peoples at the Earth Summit. On July 4, 1996, he supervised the repatriation of 74 wampum belts from the Museum of the American Indian.

Shenandoah mainly lived on the Onondaga Reservation near Syracuse, New York. He died on July 22, 1996. (Note: Different obituaries report Shenandoah as having died either at his home or at Syracuse University Hospital.)

== Early life ==
Leon Shenandoah was born on May 18, 1915. When he was three years old, he was scalded badly by a pot of hot water. Near death, Shenandoah was brought to a Seneca medicine man to be healed. During the healing ceremony, an elder stood and declared that he had foreseen that Shenandoah would someday hold a high position among their people.

In 1955, the Onondaga Clan Mothers raised him to become an Onondaga chief.

== Personal beliefs ==
Shenandoah practiced the Longhouse Religion, and as Tadodaho, he was instrumental in its revival among the Haudenosaunee. In general, he was a staunch advocate for the sovereignty and autonomy of the Haudenosaunee, and of the Onondaga in particular. He believed that in the future, American Indian culture and society would rise to strength once more, and Western society, having ruined itself with pollution and insatiable greed, would be forced to turn to Indians for salvation. He reportedly often quoted ancient prophecies to support his claims that the era of purification had come.

== Years as Tadodaho ==
Shenandoah was publicly elevated to Tadodaho on December 7, 1968. As Tadodaho, Shenandoah worked for the autonomous sovereignty of the Haudenosaunee Confederacy and Onondaga Nation as independent nations from the United States. Throughout his career, he refused many proposals by various businesses which he thought would weaken the sovereignty of the Haudenosaunee Confederacy or which broke the spirit of the Great Law of Peace. This included casinos, arms trafficking, and tobacco smuggling as well as the sale of fireworks, gasoline, and alcohol; casinos, in particular, he believed to be the latest scheme by the U.S. Government to erode Indian society. He kept casinos off the Onondaga reservation and encouraged the leaders of the other Haudenosaunee tribes to do the same.

In 1983, Shenandoah directly defied the U.S. federal government by providing sanctuary to Dennis Banks, who had been convicted in South Dakota of riot and assault with a deadly weapon. Arguing that the Onondaga were a sovereign nation, he refused to recognize any United States arrest warrant.

Shenandoah attended the United Nations General Assembly in 1985 and presented a speech calling for a global ceasefire and general worldwide peace.

Sometime around 1986, a Kentucky farmer discovered a large indigenous burial site on his land and began charging treasure hunters to dig up artifacts. When Shenandoah and fellow Onondaga chief Vincent Johnson heard of this, the pair went to the farm to restore the burial site and burn tobacco to put the spirits of the dead at rest.

Shenandoah and the other Haudenosaunee chiefs decreed in 1987 that no Fourth of July fireworks would be sold at roadside stands on the reservations.

At the 1992 Earth Summit, Shenandoah met with Indigenous Amazon leaders, burning tobacco, giving corn, and sharing a prayer with them. He shared advice on how to deal with white politicians, which led to the tribes demanding that Brazilian museums return their sacred religious artifacts. The tribes also lobbied for the creation of a new state dedicated to governing the indigenous peoples in Brazil. At the conference, he predicted the economic and spiritual damage which the North American Free Trade Agreement would do to indigenous people.

== Death ==
Approximately eight months before Shenandoah's death on July 22, 1996, Shenandoah was released from his duties as Tadodaho by the Onondaga Clan Mothers when his health sharply declined. The position was kept unfilled in the hopes that Shenandoah would recover, and on July 6, 1996, Shenandoah took the position back for the few weeks preceding his death. It was at this time that he was able to settle the return of 74 wampum belts from the Museum of the American Indian. Upon Shenandoah's death, runners were dispatched with wampum belts to inform Haudenosaunee communities in the traditional manner. He was succeeded as Tadodaho by Sidney Hill, another Onondaga Eel Clan member, who currently holds the position.

Shenandoah's funeral was held on the Onondaga reservation on July 24, 1996. It was the largest gathering of Haudenosaunee people in modern times, and the funeral was attended even by many who opposed his policies as Tadodaho, including the business owners whose casinos, weapons, and tobacco Shenandoah had blocked.
