= Economy of the Haudenosaunee =

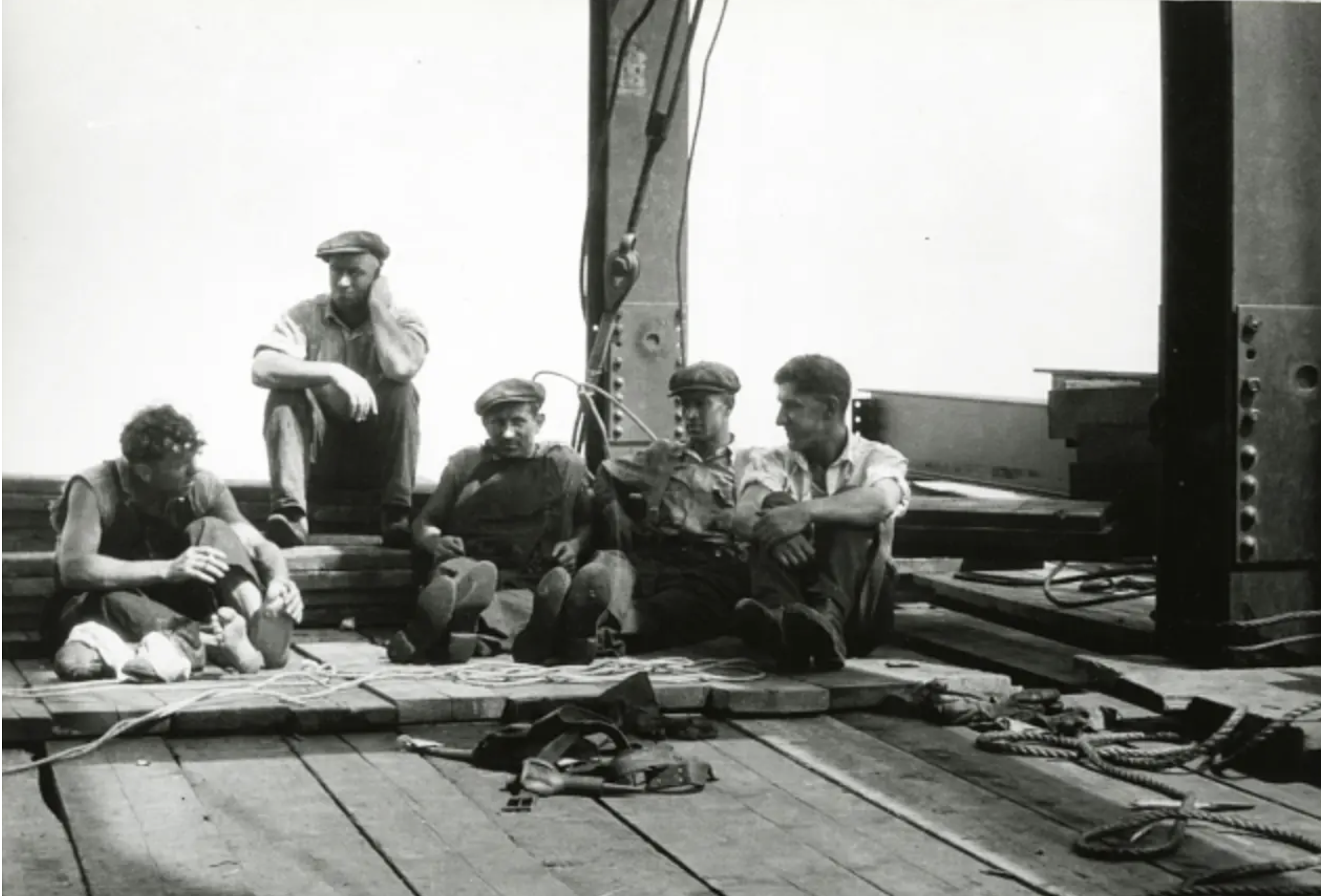
Mohawk ironworkers on the Chrysler Building, New York, late 1920s

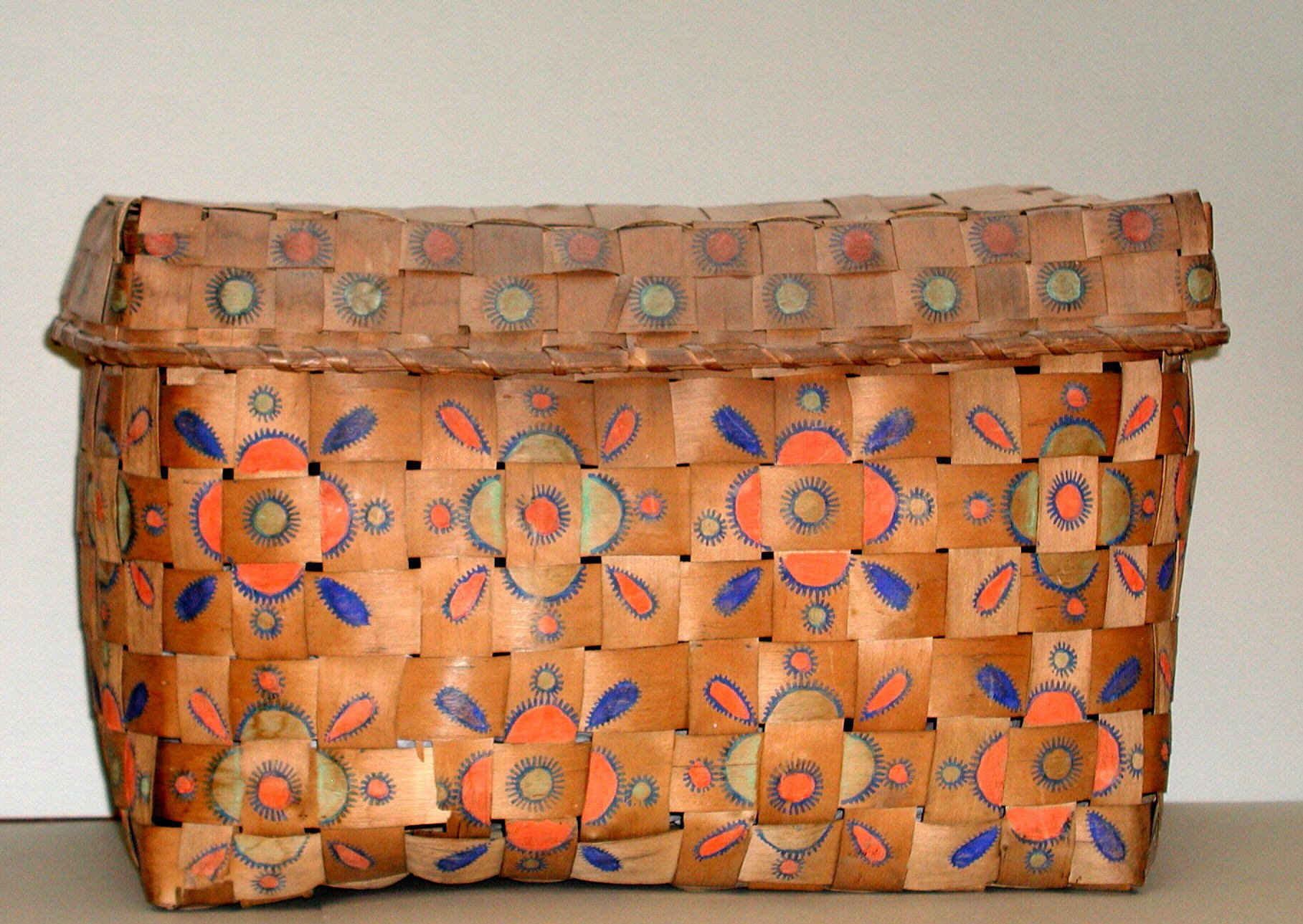
Oneida brown ash basket, c. 1860. Basket-making provided income for many Haudenosaunee families in the 19th century after the collapse of the fur trade.

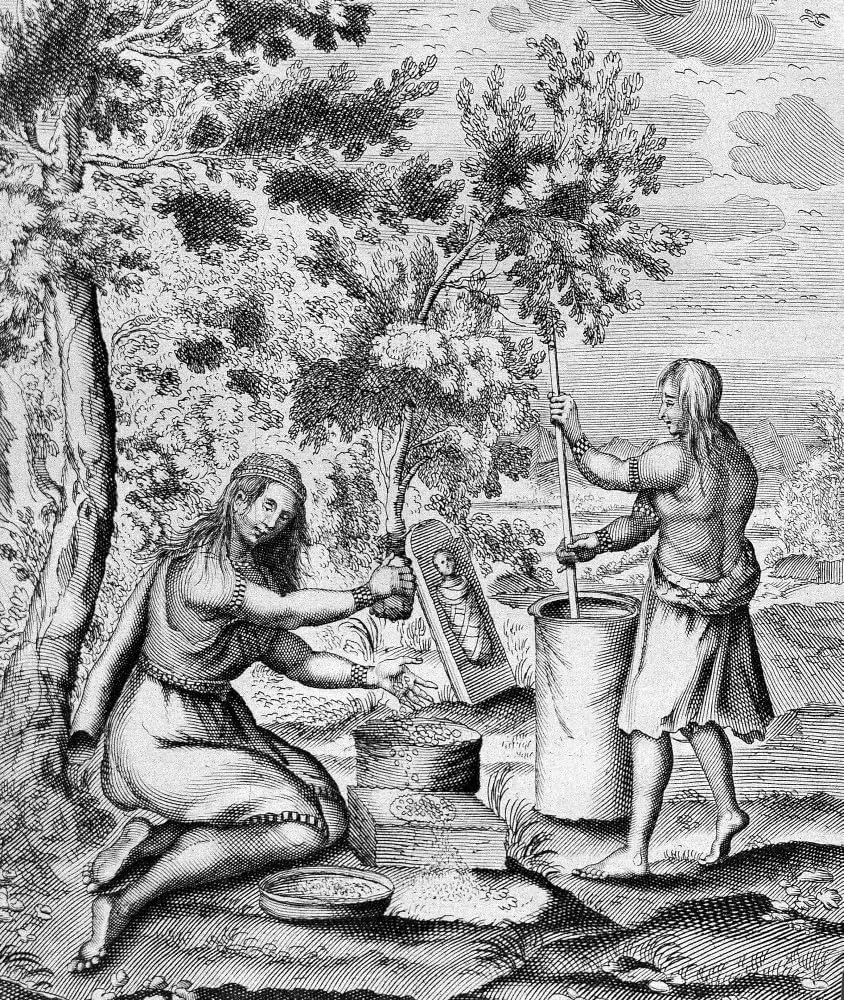
Iroquois women at work grinding grains and dried fruits (engraving from 1664).

The economy of the Haudenosaunee consists of the production, trade, and consumption of goods and services by the Haudenosaunee, or Iroquois, a confederacy of six Indigenous peoples of the Northeastern Woodlands, who primarily live in Ontario and New York, today with some tribes living in Wisconsin and Oklahoma.

When the Haudenosaunee encountered early European settlers, their economy was based on a collective system of production that integrated agriculture with hunting and gathering. This economic structure was shared across the tribes of the Haudenosaunee Confederacy, a political alliance of initially five tribes (Seneca, Cayuga, Onondaga, Oneida, and Mohawk), later joined by the Tuscarora, forming the Six Nations. They inhabited regions corresponding to present-day New York State and the Great Lakes area. Despite historical rivalries, these groups maintained similar economic practices.

The Haudenosaunee were primarily agriculturalists, cultivating the "Three Sisters" (maize, beans, and squash), which were dietary staples common among Indigenous peoples of the Eastern Woodlands. As semi-sedentary communities, they supplemented their diet through fishing in spring and hunting during autumn and winter, with men typically leaving villages for these activities. Their cultural practices were closely tied to this economic lifestyle, influencing their views on nature and property management.

The Haudenosaunee economy differed significantly from Western economic models. It featured collective land ownership, a gendered division of labor, and a gift-based exchange system. Social homogeneity was disrupted by the incorporation of captives from frequent conflicts with neighboring groups, with surviving prisoners facing outcomes ranging from enslavement to adoption.

Sustained contact with Europeans, beginning in the late 16th century, profoundly affected Haudenosaunee society. Initially, they became key trading partners, but European colonial expansion disrupted their traditional economy. By the early 19th century, the Haudenosaunee were largely confined to reservations in the United States and in Canada, prompting adaptations to their economic system. In the 20th century, some Haudenosaunee communities leveraged reservation autonomy to establish businesses such as casinos, while others integrated into the broader economy. Elements of their traditional economic practices continue to influence contemporary Haudenosaunee communities, particularly in their approach to resource management and cultural heritage preservation on reservations.

== Conditions and types of production ==
=== Environment and natural resources ===
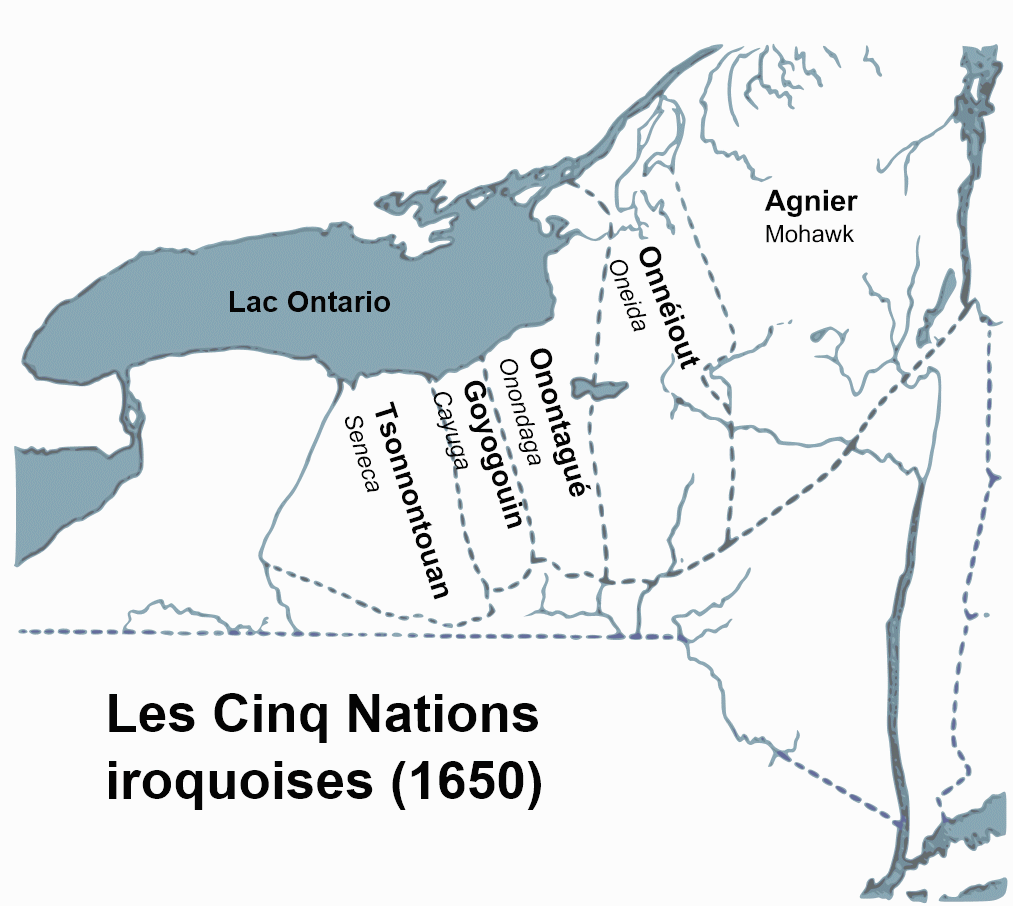
Territories occupied by the Five Nations around 1650.

Haudenosaunee territory has been situated in the central portion of the Eastern Woodlands of North America. In the 17th century, Haudenosaunee territory encompassed the area south of Lake Ontario, from the shores of Lake Erie to those of the Hudson. Bounded to the west and north by Lakes Erie and Ontario as well as the St. Lawrence River, and to the east by the Appalachian Mountains, the region lacked significant internal natural barriers or environmental discontinuities. This position afforded defensive security while enabling offensive mobility, as the Haudenosaunee occupied the higher elevations from which numerous waterways descended, facilitating rapid outward movement. The landscape featured hills covered with temperate forests including hemlock, maples, pines, oaks, and other species, interspersed with fertile valleys and alluvial plains.

Haudenosaunee farmers primarily grow the "Three Sisters," intercropped squash and pumpkins (Cucurbita pepo), beans (various Phaseolus species), and maize (Zea mays), which grown together produce more calories and protein than monocultures of the species produce. They also grew melons originating from the Mississippi Valley. These were complemented by wild plants, including roots, nuts from hickory, walnut, chestnut, and oak trees, and maple syrup derived from sugar maple sap. Berries such as raspberries, blueberries, strawberries, and cranberries were gathered, along with wild grapes from vines in fire-cleared areas. Additional fruits included crabapples, mayapples, and pawpaws.

Natural resources for tools and construction were equally plentiful. Animal hides and furs were used for clothing and equipment, while horns, bones, tendons, and mollusk shells served in tool and utensil manufacture. Timber was sourced from forest trees, with bark from ash, elm, arborvitae (white cedar), balsam fir, and spruce used for coverings. White ash wood and slippery elm bark were employed in canoe construction, and hemlock for snowshoes. Fibers from the inner bark of slippery elm, leatherwood (Dirca palustris), and wild hemp dogbane were processed into cordage and thread. Reed and maize leaves were woven into mats. Clay deposits supported pottery production. The region, however, contained little copper ore (the primary metal worked by Indigenous peoples) and stone tools were used sparingly. Prior to European contact, metal implements were absent.

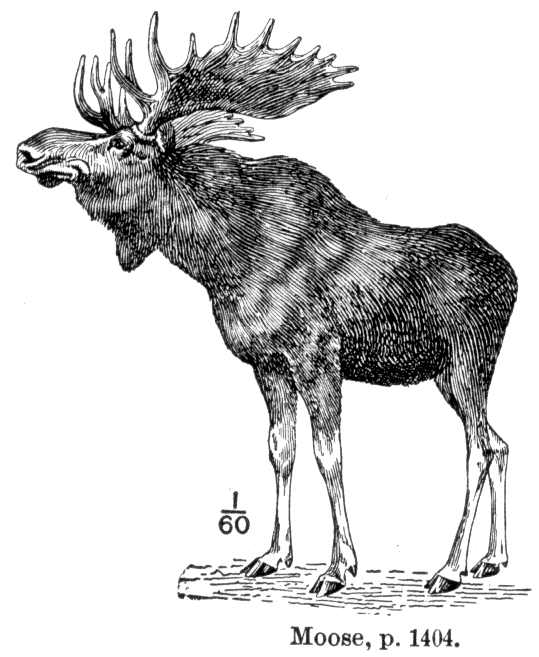
The moose, called orignal in America, was the largest game of the Haudenosaunee (engraving from the Encyclopédie).

=== Primary activities ===
The Haudenosaunee had a mixed economy. Their primary productive activities included gathering fruits and roots, trapping, hunting, fishing, along with maize, bean, and squash agriculture. Maize was the primary consumed food in their diet. Fruits and roots contributed regularly as well, and formed a notable portion of it. Successful harvests and maple syrup production often led to communal feasts. These resources, however, were secondary to game, which the Haudenosaunee pursued both within their territory and in distant regions.

Winter served as the principal hunting season, although birds were hunted in autumn and spring, and trapping occurred year-round. Early cold weather focused on deer and beaver. Bears were primarily hunted during their hibernation period from January to May. Starting in October, hunting parties ranged across the region, venturing east and north into the Adirondacks and present-day Canada, as well as west and south to the Niagara area and the territories now comprising Ohio and Pennsylvania. By January, these groups typically returned to their villages. Fishing employed various methods from mid-March until early winter, with salmon and eel providing the most abundant yields.

Agriculture entailed a series of extended and intricate processes. Maize cultivation involved four main stages: clearing, sowing, plant growth, and harvesting. This cycle generally spanned the entire growing season. In cases of challenging clearing, initial harvests might require several years of preparation. Due to extensive farming practices and associated village relocations, fields were fully renewed every 10 to 12 years. Portions of cleared land were allocated to melons and, to a lesser extent, sunflower and tobacco. The majority, however, was dedicated to intercropping the "Three Sisters" .

The emphasis on each activity varied among tribes, with those in less densely forested areas prioritizing agriculture. Overall, the selection of high-quality soil for village sites and their relative permanence suggest that agriculture predominated in both diet and daily life for the Haudenosaunee, despite the significant roles of hunting and fishing.

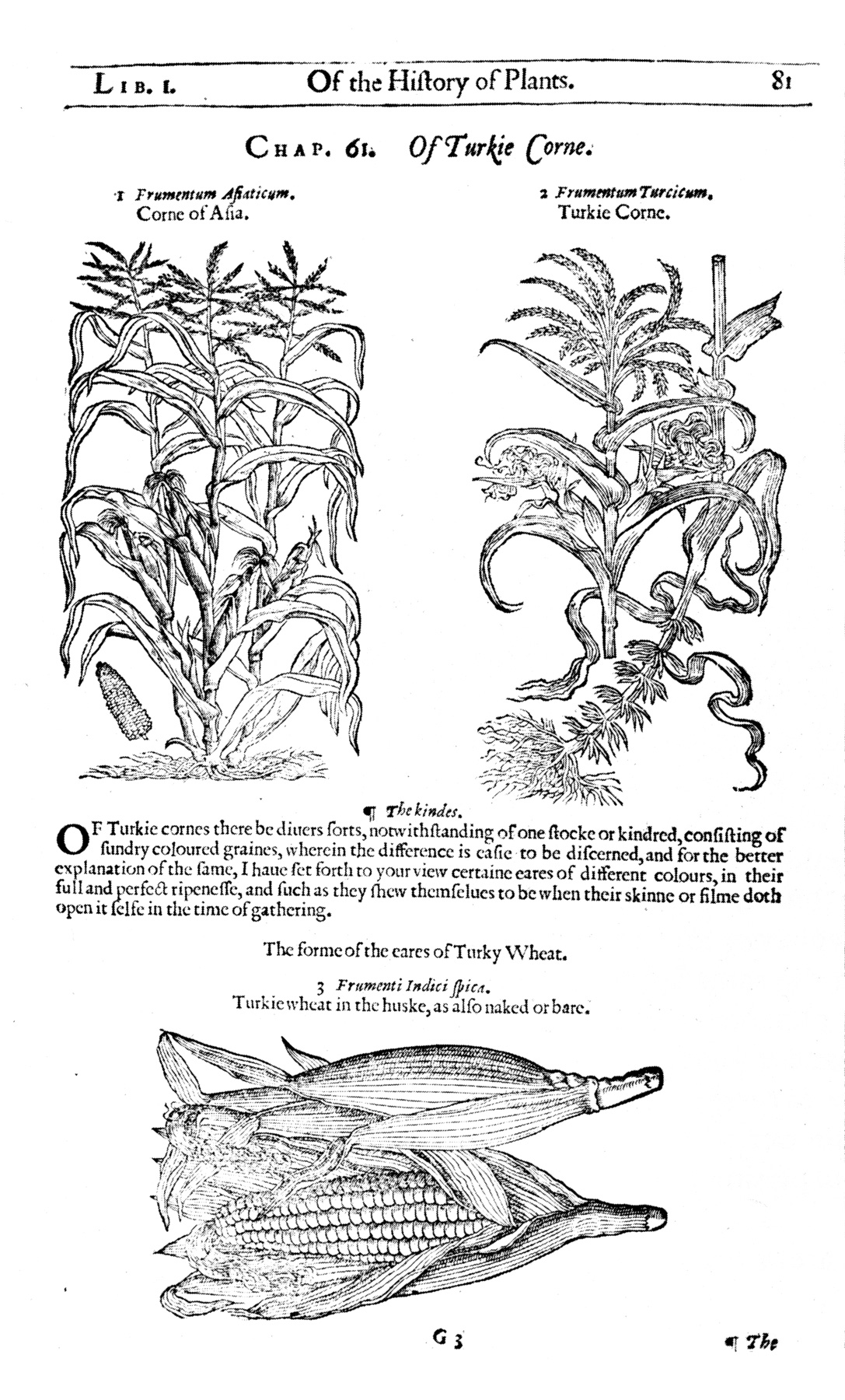
Maize, the quintessential Native American cereal, in a 1633 flora.

=== Capital and consumption goods ===
In addition to primary productive activities, the Haudenosaunee engaged in various handicrafts, particularly during the relatively idle period following the return from winter hunting. Manufactured items encompassed both consumer goods and capital tools. Key general-purpose implements included the knife, crafted from wood, bone, shell, or stone and used in hunting, combat, and daily tasks, and the stone-bladed axe, employed in numerous activities including tree felling in conjunction with fire.

Specialized tools addressed specific needs. For hunting, the bow was central, typically human-sized and made from red cedar or comparable wood, fire-hardened, and strung with hemp or deer tendon. Arrows, approximately one meter long, were sometimes fletched with two feathers to enhance accuracy through rotation. Tips were usually stone, though wood, bone, or horn was also used. Traps and snares consisted of hemp ropes or bark. Fishing equipment primarily featured harpoons of horn or bone and nets woven from hemp or bark fiber, with efficacy improved by various weirs. Agricultural implements included the rake (a large wooden fork) for clearing debris after burning and axing, the digging stick (a curved wooden tool with a long handle) for soil preparation, and hoes of wood or deer scapula attached to handles for weeding.

Transportation equipment formed another category. Overland portage employed wooden stretchers or woven bark fiber straps worn across the forehead or chest. In winter, wooden sleds were pulled by individuals on snowshoes. Water travel utilized bark and wood canoes, ranging from 4 to 12 meters in length and accommodating 2 to 30 people.

Consumer products derived from hunting, fishing, and especially agriculture using the described methods. Maize, prepared in forms such as sagamité, formed the dietary staple and primary stored surplus. Game meat and fish supplemented reserves when smoked or dried. Animal products supplied most clothing materials. Housing consisted of wood and bark structures; portable hunting shelters contrasted with longhouses, which, enclosed by palisades, formed semi-permanent villages.

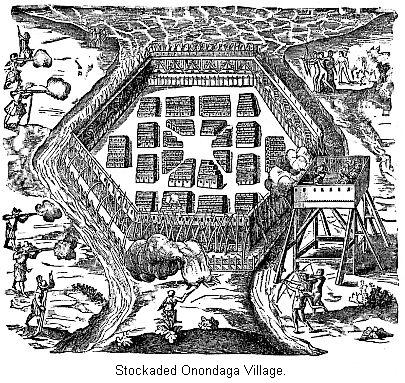
Onondaga, a fortified Haudenosaunee village, after a sketch by Samuel de Champlain.

== Historical forms of economic organization ==
=== Land ownership ===
The Haudenosaunee employed a comparable system. Tribes owned all lands, assigning territories to clans, which then distributed plots to households for farming. Land was periodically redistributed among households every few years. Clans could petition the Clan Mothers' Council for reallocation. The council issued warnings to clans for land abuse or neglect, with the severest penalty being reassignment of their territory to another clan. Women controlled land ownership, consistent with their role in food cultivation.

The Clan Mothers' Council also designated certain plots for communal cultivation by women from all clans. Produce from these fields, known as kěndiǔ"gwǎ'ge' hodi'yěn'tho, was used for feasts and large gatherings.

=== Division of labor: fields and forest ===
The division of labor in Haudenosaunee society reflected a dualistic cultural framework, symbolized by the twin gods Hahgwehdiyu (Young Tree, East) and Hahgwehdaetgah (Flint, West), representing complementary roles. Labor was distinctly divided by gender, with women managing agricultural tasks and men handling forest-related activities such as clearing and woodworking. Men primarily engaged in hunting, fishing, trade, and warfare, while women were responsible for farming, foraging, and household duties. Handicraft tasks were also gender-specific: men constructed buildings and produced most equipment, including agricultural tools used by women, whereas women crafted smaller trapping gear, pottery, household utensils, furniture, textiles, and clothing. This gender-based specialization formed the core of Haudenosaunee labor organization. At the time of European contact, women contributed approximately 65% of goods produced, with men accounting for 35%. The diversified food production system, spanning most of the year, minimized risks of shortages and famine, earning admiration from early European settlers for its efficiency.

The labor structure aligned with the Haudenosaunee system of communal land ownership. Women organized into large groups to assist one another in field tasks, moving collectively from plot to plot. During communal sowing, a designated "field mistress" allocated seeds to each participant. Each group selected an elderly, active woman as a work leader for the year, whose directives were followed. Women also collaborated in other tasks, such as cutting wood, with the leader overseeing its collective transport to the village. According to Mary Jemison, a European woman assimilated into Haudenosaunee society, this collective approach prevented jealousy by ensuring equitable effort among participants.

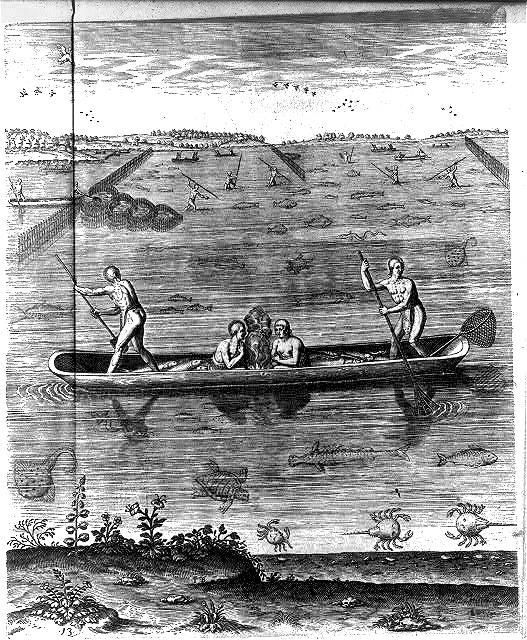
Powhatans fishing in a manner similar to the Haudenosaunee, after an engraving by John White published by Theodor de Bry in his Grands Voyages (1590).

Men employed cooperative strategies in warfare, hunting, and fishing. Hunting expeditions often utilized collective techniques, such as constructing a large V-shaped brush barrier in the forest. Beaters set fire to the open end, driving game toward an apex where village hunters waited, sometimes killing up to 100 deer in a single drive. Fishing expeditions involved large groups deploying canoes, nets, and weirs to capture substantial quantities of fish, occasionally up to 1,000 in half a day. Catches from hunting or fishing were treated as communal property, either pooled and redistributed by the expedition leader or brought to the village for consumption, primarily among men, during feasts. While individual hunting and fishing occurred, group efforts generally yielded greater success.

=== Exchange ===
Before European contact, the collective production and distribution of goods in Haudenosaunee society constrained the development of internal trade. However, regional variations in natural resources and lifestyles facilitated exchanges with neighboring tribes. The Haudenosaunee traded surplus grain and tobacco for furs from northern tribes and wampum (ceremonial shell belts) from Eastern tribes. They also acquired high-quality birchbark canoes from the Algonquins, as birch trees were absent in Haudenosaunee territory.

The predominant mode of exchange was the gift and counter-gift system, reflecting the reciprocal nature of Haudenosaunee social relations. This practice involved one clan offering goods to another tribe or clan, anticipating a useful item in return. Rooted in the Haudenosaunee emphasis on shared property and cooperative labor, these exchanges lacked explicit agreements or fixed prices. Instead, a service or gift was provided for the benefit of the community or an individual, with the expectation of a reciprocal gesture.

External trade provided limited opportunities for individual initiative. An individual who established a new trade route gained exclusive rights to it. However, clans could collectively control trade routes to secure monopolies over specific types of trade.

== Post-contact economies (16th to 20th centuries) ==
=== Trade and dependence ===
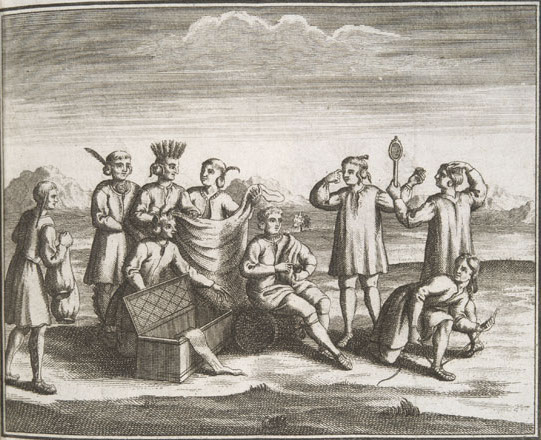
Haudenosaunee people with Western trade goods, probably acquired through exchange (French engraving, 1722).

When Europeans, specifically the Dutch, arrived in Haudenosaunee territory in the late 16th century, they began to trade; the Haudenosaunee provided beaver and otter pelts in exchange for European tools, cloth, and glass beads. In the early years of trade with the Dutch and later French, from 1655 to 1754, Haudenosaunee people traded for exotic items they wanted but were not reliant on.

European demand for furs was substantial, driven by the perception that North America offered inexhaustible supplies. In exchange, Europeans provided goods not produced by Indigenous peoples, including metal tools and utensils (such as iron axes, knives, awls and fish hooks of iron, kettles of copper), textiles (wool blankets, linen shirts), jewelry, glass beads, and firearms.

Indigenous groups developed dependencies as European items supplanted traditional ones. Intensified trapping depleted fur-bearing animals, heightening conflicts over hunting territories. During the first half of the 17th century, wars and European-introduced epidemics drastically reduced Native populations, disrupting traditional lifestyles. Exploiting the gift and counter-gift system, the Dutch and later the British, established near the Hudson River mouth, supplied the Haudenosaunee with gifts like iron axes and muskets to secure alliances against the French. Once traditional weapons were discarded, the Haudenosaunee relied on continued trade for gunpowder and ammunition.

To access desired European goods, the Haudenosaunee sought control over beaver-abundant areas south of the Canadian Shield. In 1628, armed with Dutch-supplied firearms, they displaced the Mahicans eastward. In the 1630s, they targeted the Algonquins of the Ottawa Valley and, from the early 1640s, New France and its Algonquin and Montagnais allies. The 1640s and 1650s witnessed the Five Nations subjugating or dispersing neighboring Iroquoian and Algonquian groups. The Hurons, key French allies and trading partners, abandoned their territory after the 1649 destruction of two major villages. Most other Iroquoian groups met similar fates over the next decade. The Susquehannock in the south were assimilated by 1675. With local fur animals depleted, the Haudenosaunee expanded westward into the Ohio Valley, occupied by the Illinois and Miami, waging exterminatory wars in the late 17th century to monopolize hunting grounds without permanent settlement.

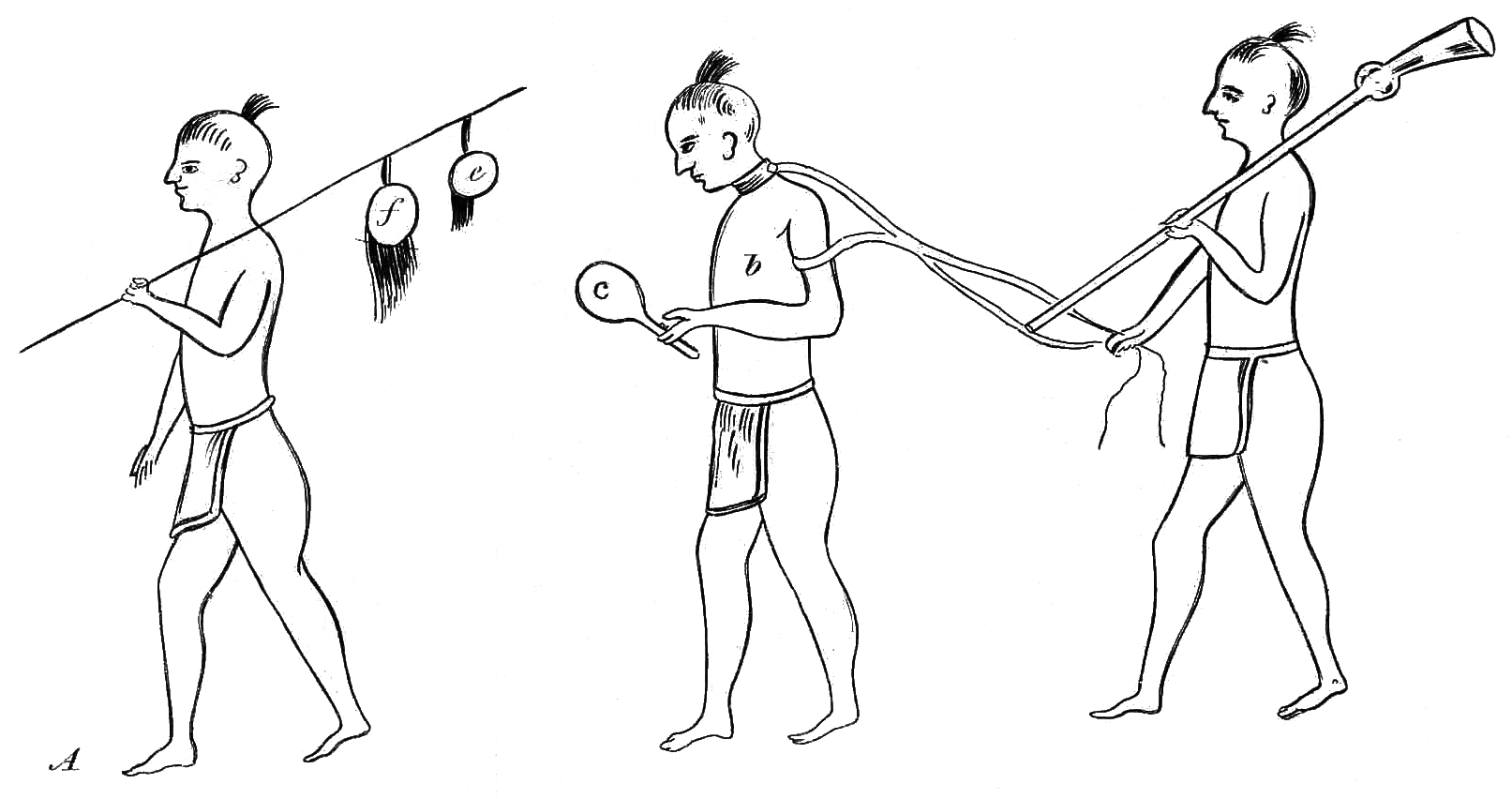
Prisoner of war and his Haudenosaunee escort (American drawing from 1849).

Despite dominating surrounding tribes, the Haudenosaunee did not achieve anticipated prosperity. Devastated by warfare and disease, they replenished populations through large-scale adoption of Iroquoian-speaking captives and refugees. Over the next century, attacks from French-allied Algonquins and British colonial expansion confined them to original borders. As mass adoption was restricted to Haudenosaunee peoples, numbers declined to 12,000 by 1768 and 8,000 by 1783. Traditional captivity evolved into commercial slavery, supplying non-adopted prisoners to meet colonial demands, including raids on southern Black slaves. This practice contributed to internal social differentiation and weakening. Indigenous peoples also traded for alcohol, unknown prior to European contact. Pennsylvania delegates, including Benjamin Franklin, noted such requests in reports to provincial authorities. Alcohol remained integral to the fur trade, increasing as fur resources dwindled and land cessions rose.

The fur trade declined in the 19th century when beaver populations were overhunted and beaver furs and felt fell out of fashion in Europe.

=== Relegation and integration into the modern economy ===
Following the American Revolutionary War, in which most Haudenosaunee nations allied with the British, their territories were subjected to United States incursions. The Sullivan Expedition conducted assaults on the Haudenosaunee economy during the war. The Haudenosaunee economy required large tracts of land to function, due to diverse inputs of agriculture, hunting, and gathering. As land was sold off, cash payments became more important in sustaining their economy. Many Haudenosaunee, such as the Cayuga, sought refuge in Canada, where approximately half the population has resided since. In the United States, significant portions of their lands were sold to New York speculators.

==== 19th century ====
From the early 19th century, both nations implemented policies of relocation and confinement to reservations. Nonetheless, maize cultivation persisted as a key subsistence practice in some communities until mid-century, primarily managed by women, while men continued annual hunting expeditions lasting several weeks.

Land reduction and game scarcity prompted diversification. Haudenosaunee women developed handicrafts tailored to the growing tourist market, with Tuscarora artisans achieving notable success. Proximity to Niagara Falls, a premier 19th-century attraction, enabled Tuscarora women to secure exclusive vending rights for beadwork after the War of 1812, adapting products to Victorian preferences. This enterprise continued for over a century.

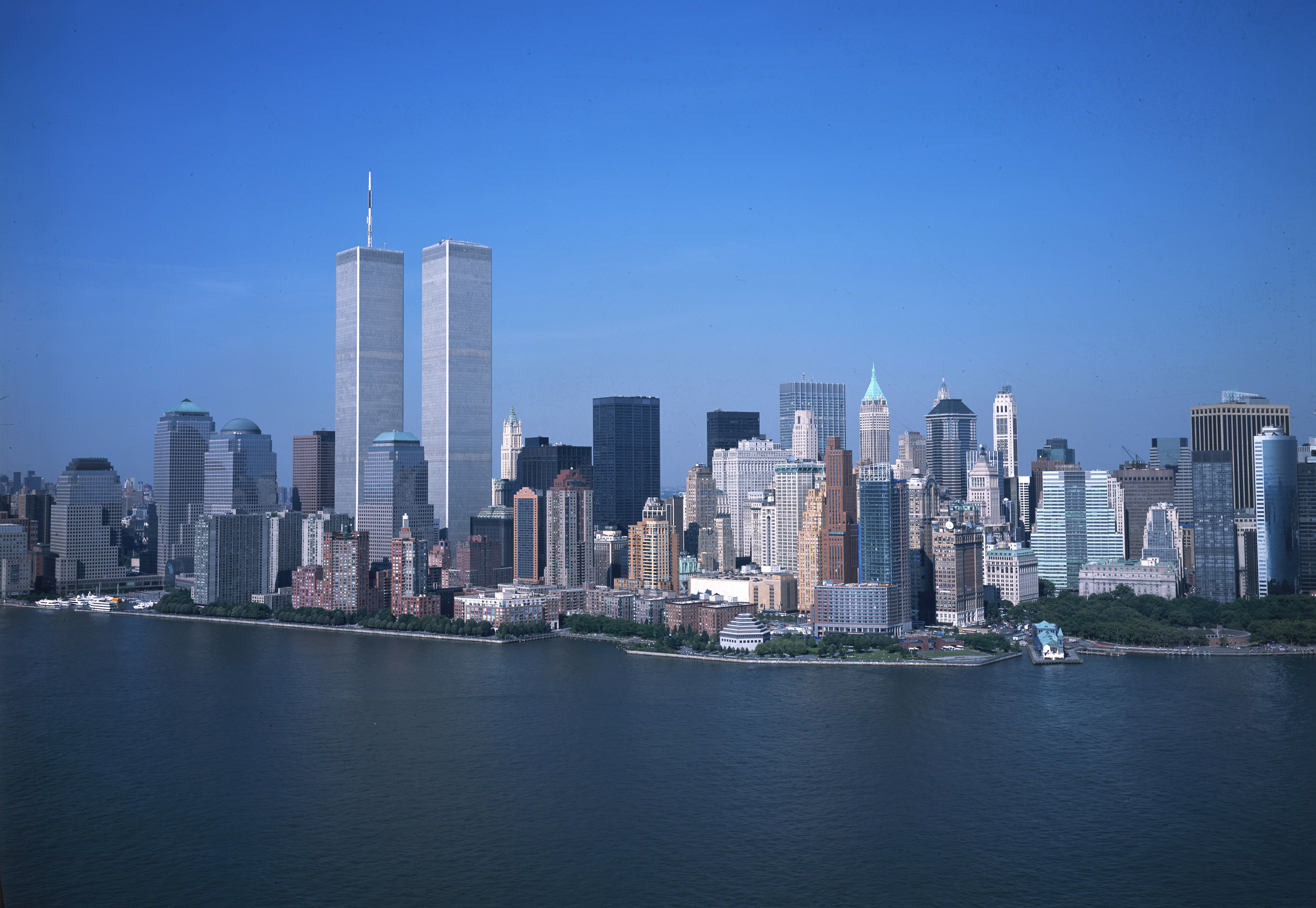
Many Mohawk men worked on the construction of skyscrapers, from the Empire State Building to the World Trade Center.

Wage labor emerged as the predominant trend for men, initially in logging, metallurgy, and canoe manufacturing. This shift disrupted traditional gender roles; by the mid-19th century, women were increasingly marginalized economically. From the late 19th century, generations of Haudenosaunee specialized in structural steelwork. The practice began in 1886 during construction of the Canadian Pacific Railway bridge over the St. Lawrence, where Mohawks from Kahnawake were employed in exchange for land access. Mohawks subsequently gained renown for contributions to skyscrapers and bridges in New York and Pittsburgh, with some drawing parallels between this mobile, high-risk labor and ancestral hunting practices.

==== 20th century ====
In remote reservations, limited employment and education opportunities fostered poverty and reliance on government assistance by the early 20th century. Post-Great Depression urbanization accelerated, continuing thereafter, though migrants maintained ties through frequent visits, returns during unemployment, or retirement. Traditional subsistence activities like hunting, gathering, and fishing became marginal, while agriculture declined amid population growth, land fragmentation, technological changes, and evolving gender task allocation.

Scholar Robert B. Porter writes Haudenosaunee economies changed drastically in the 1980s with the introduction of entrepreneurs selling cigarettes and gasoline tax-free. This resulted in non-Indigenous people travelling to reserves in large numbers, leading to increased profits, jobs and local businesses. He notes tribal governments began opening their own businesses as a result, increasing tribal revenue.

== 21st century ==
Many Haudenosaunee are now integrated into the Canadian and United States economies. Others operate within reservation frameworks, though activities are increasingly shaped by national and global forces. Economic challenges persist on reservations; for instance, unemployment on the U.S. portion of the Mohawk reserve reached 46%. Successful ventures include those of the Oneida, Seneca, and Cayuga. The Seneca reservation includes Salamanca, a hardwood industry center where Native Americans comprise 13% of the population. Leveraging sovereignty, Senecas offer tax-free gasoline and cigarettes and operate high-stakes bingo. In New York, they manage the Seneca Niagara Casino near Niagara Falls and Seneca Allegany Casino in Salamanca, with plans for the Seneca Buffalo Creek Casino in Buffalo.

=== Contemporary extensions of the traditional model ===
The current flag of the Haudenosaunee Confederacy reproduces the design of an ancient wampum, the Hiawatha Belt.

The traditional Haudenosaunee land management system underwent significant changes following European contact and subsequent confinement to reservations. In pre-contact society, land functioned as communal property, accessible to group members based on need. Although plots were allocated to individual families, land was not viewed as a commodity, contrasting with Western perspectives. Post-contact adaptations aligned more closely with European models, yet Haudenosaunee communities retained distinct property concepts. Contemporary Haudenosaunee author Doug George-Kanentiio (Akwesasne Mohawk) articulates this view: the Haudenosaunee hold "no absolute right to claim territory for purely financial reasons. Our Creator entrusted us with Aboriginal lands, with very specific rules regarding their use. We are the guardians of Mother Earth, not the lords of the soil. Our claims are valid only insofar as we know how to remain on her in peace and harmony."

A 1981 statement by the Haudenosaunee Council of Chiefs further distinguishes "Western European concepts of land ownership" from the Haudenosaunee perspective that "the land is sacred" and "was created for the use of all and for all time (not for the exclusive benefit of the present generation)." It asserts that "land is not a mere commodity" and "under no circumstances is land for sale." The statement elaborates: "According to Haudenosaunee law, Gayanerkowa, land is owned by the women of each clan. It is primarily women who are responsible for the land, who cultivate it and preserve it for future generations. When the Confederacy was formed, the separate nations formed a union. The territory of each nation became confederal land, although each nation continued to have a special interest in its historic territory." This reflects the enduring unique Haudenosaunee approach to property.

==== Usage of traditional methodology ====
In Canada, the Six Nations Reserve incorporates traditional structures into modern governance. Established in the 18th century via two notarial acts, the reserve grants undivided ownership to the Six Nations collectively. Individuals may secure perpetual leases from the Confederacy.

Principles from pre-contact systems persist, such as land reverting to communal control upon abandonment. In disputes, the Haudenosaunee Confederacy Chiefs Council favored parties who improved and cultivated the land over those who neglected it. Subsurface resources belong to the tribe, not plot holders; for instance, stone quarrying is leased with royalties distributed collectively. Following natural gas discovery, the Six Nations assumed direct control of wells, compensating surface users only for extraction-related damages. These practices echo historical tribal ownership of land with distributed usufruct rights.

=== Gaming ===
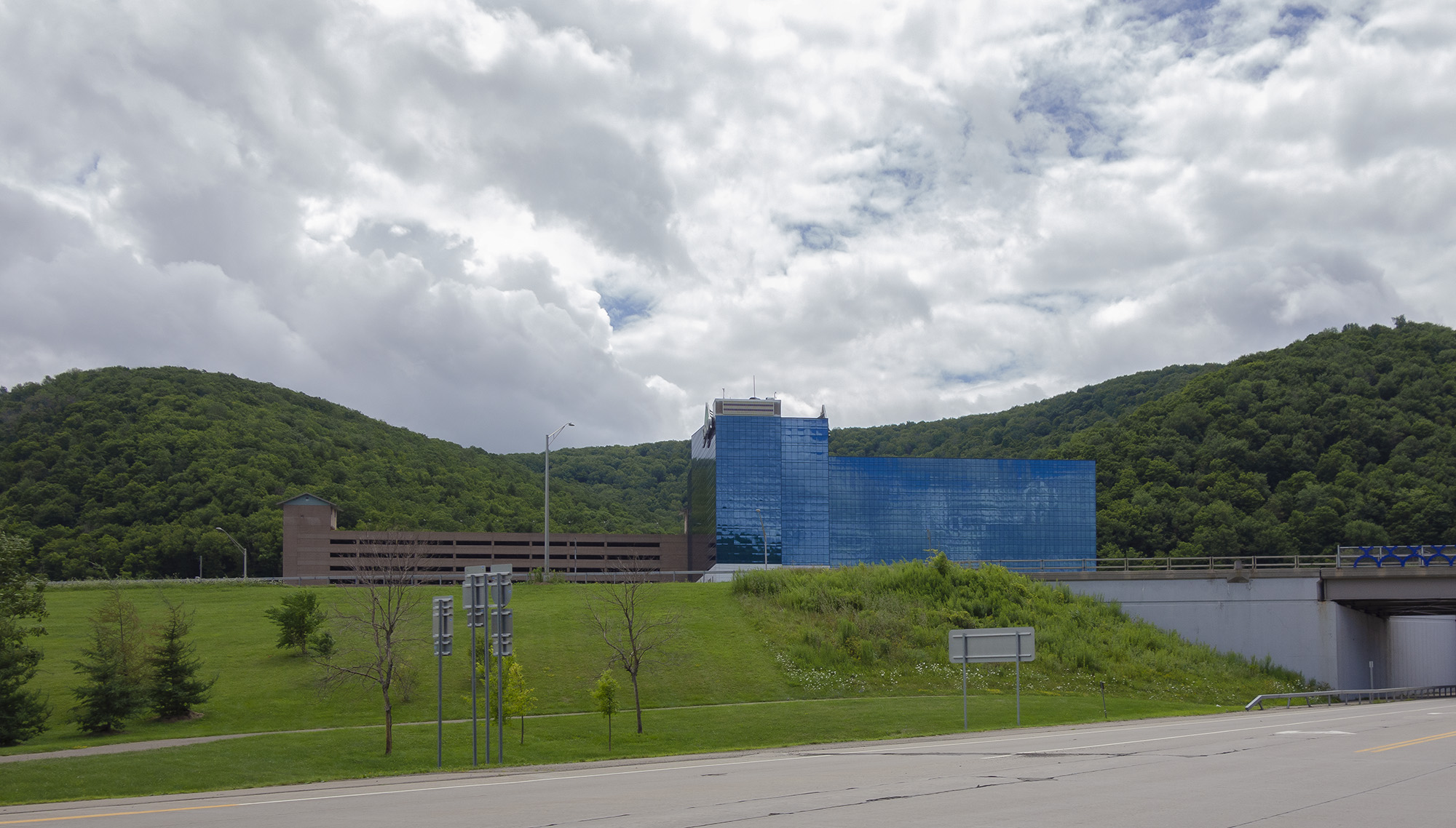
Seneca Allegany Casino in Salamanca, New York, owned by the Seneca Nation of Indians

Since the passage of the 1988 Indian Gaming Regulatory Act, casinos have become significant sources of revenue for Haudenosaunee tribes in the United States. The Cayuga Nation, Oneida Indian Nation, Saint Regis Mohawk Tribe, and Seneca Nation of Indians have casinos in New York. The Onondaga Nation opposes establishing a casino.

The Oneida Indian Nation operates casinos in New York, and the Oneida Nation operates casinos in Wisconsin. In Wisconsin, the tribe ranks among the largest employers in the northeast region of that state, with more than 3,000 workers, including 975 in tribal government. It administers more than $16 million in federal and private grants and diverse programs under legislation such as the Indian Self-Determination and Education Assistance Act.

The Seneca-Cayuga Nation based in Oklahoma has acquired ancestral territory in New York and built casinos that generate collective revenue, alongside bingo halls, gas stations, and cigarette factories. The reserve's current resource management directly stems from pre-European land ownership concepts.

== See also ==
- Erie
- Great Law of Peace
- Neutral Confederacy
- Royaner
- Susquehannock
- Tionontati Confederacy
- Wendat Confederacy
- Wyandot
- Yakoyaner

== Bibliography ==
=== Books ===
- Axtell, James (1981), yes (ed.), The Indian Peoples of Eastern America: A Documentary History of the Sexes, New York: Oxford University Press, p. 233, ISBN 978-0-19-502741-9.
- Champlain, Samuel de (1619), Voyages et découvertes faites en la nouvelle France, depuis l'année 1615 jusques à la fin de l'année 1618 [Voyages and Discoveries Made in New France, from the Year 1615 to the End of the Year 1618] (in French), Paris: C. Collet.
- George-Kanentiio, Doug (2000), Iroquois Culture and Commentary, Santa Fe: Clear Light Publishers, ISBN 978-1-57416-053-6
- Johansen, Bruce E. (1982), Forgotten Founders (PDF), Ipswich, MA: Gambit, ISBN 978-0-87645-111-3
- Johansen, Bruce E. (1999), yes (ed.), The Encyclopedia of Native American Economic History, Westport, CT: Greenwood Press, p. 301, ISBN 978-0-313-30623-5
- Noon, John A. (1949), Law and Government of the Grand River Iroquois, New York: The Viking Fund
- Sagard, Gabriel (1632), Le Grand Voyage du pays des Hurons [The Long Journey to the Country of the Hurons], Paris: Denys Moreau
- Speck, Frank G. (1945), The Iroquois, Bloomfield Hills, MI: Cranbrook Press
- Stites, Sara Henry (1905), Economics of the Iroquois, Lancaster, PA: The New Era Printing Company
- Trigger, Bruce G. (1969), The Huron Farmers of the North, New York: Holt, Rinehart and Winston, p. 130, ISBN 978-0-03-079550-3
- Wallace, Anthony F.C. (1969), The Death and Rebirth of the Seneca, New York: Vintage Books, ISBN 978-0-394-71699-2
- Bruce G. Trigger (1990). Les Indiens, la fourrure et les Blancs: Français et Amérindiens en Amérique du Nord [Indians, Fur, and White People: French and Native Americans in North America] (in French). Montréal: Boréal. ISBN 978-2-89052-274-9.
- Bruce G. Trigger (1991). Les Enfants d'Aataentsic: L'histoire du peuple huron [The Children of Aataentsic: The History of the Huron People] (in French). Libre Expression. ISBN 978-2-89111-364-9.
- Bruce G. Trigger (1992). Les Amérindiens et l'âge héroïque de la Nouvelle-France [Native Americans and the Heroic Age of New France] (in French). Société historique du Canada. ISBN 978-0-88798-166-1.
- Roland Viau (1997). Enfants du néant et mangeurs d'âmes: Guerre, culture et société en Iroquoisie ancienne [Children of Nothingness and Soul Eaters: War, Culture, and Society in Ancient Iroquoisia] (in French). Montréal: Boréal. ISBN 978-2-89052-807-9.
- Roland Viau (2000). Femmes de personne: Sexes, genres et pouvoirs en Iroquoisie ancienne [Women of No One: Sex, Gender, and Power in Ancient Iroquois Society] (in French). Montréal: Boréal. ISBN 978-2-7646-0052-8.
- Anderson, Scott W. (2024). Pricing the Land: The Buying and Selling of Frontier New York and the Cayuga Reservation. Ithaca, NY: Cornell University Press. ISBN 9781501775703. LCCN 2023040592.
- Allen, Kathleen M.S.; Katz, Sandra (2016). "Iroquoian Settlements in Central New York State in the Sixteenth Century: A Case Study of Intra- and Inter-Site Diversity". In Jones, Eric E.; Creese, John L. (eds.). Process and Meaning in Spatial Archaeology: Investigations into Pre-Columbian Iroquoian Space and Place. Boulder, CO: University Press of Colorado. ISBN 978-1-60732-510-9.

=== Journal and review articles ===
- Jim Adams, « Oklahoma Native Tribe Buys Land in New York State », Indian Country Today, 24 November 2002
- Baril, Daniel (30 October 2000), "Sexes et pouvoirs en Iroquoisie" [Sexes and Powers in Iroquoia], Forum, 35 (9).
- Alain Testart, « Roland Viau, Enfants du néant et mangeurs d'âmes : Guerre, culture et société en Iroquoisie ancienne », L'Homme, No. 152, October–December 1999
- Alain Testart, « Roland Viau, Femmes de personne : Sexes, genres et pouvoirs en Iroquoisie ancienne », L'Homme, No. 163, July–September 2002
- Porter, Robert B. (1998). "Building a New Longhouse: The Case for Government Reform within the Six Nations of the Haudenosaunee" (PDF). Buffalo Law Review. 46 (3). Amherst, NY: University at Buffalo Law School: 805–945. ISSN 0023-9356. OCLC 01537639.

=== Online publications ===
- The Canadian Encyclopedia, Historica Foundation,
- The Iroquois of the Northeast, presentation of the permanent exhibition at the Carnegie Museum of Natural History, 1998
- Ohio History Central, online encyclopedia on the history of Ohio, 2005
- « About Salamanca » on http://www.salmun.com, 2008
- « The Oneida Indians of Wisconsin » on http://www.jefflindsay.com, 2005
- Report of the Royal Commission on Aboriginal Peoples, online on the website of the Canadian Ministry of Indigenous and Northern Affairs, 1996 (particularly chapters 4 and 5)
