= Haudenosaunee Confederacy Chiefs Council =

Government of the Haudenosaunee Confederacy

Grand Council of the Haudenosaunee Confederacy

Type
- Type: Unicameral

Leadership
- Thadodá·hoʼ: Sid Hill

Structure
- Seats: 50 Rotiyanehson; 6 Tuscarora chiefs (observer status) (Note: Having joined the Confederacy in the 1700s, the hereditary leaders of the Tuscarora are not counted among the 50 founding Rotiyanehson of the Haudenosaunee. They have no formal voice within the Grand Council and raise issues through the Cayuga.)
- Political groups: Non-aligned assembly (Consensus based)
- Length of term: Life tenure (can be recalled by Clan Mother)

Elections
- Voting system: Condolence by Clan Mothers

Meeting place
- Onondaga

Website
- www.haudenosauneeconfederacy.com

Constitution
- Great Law of Peace

The Haudenosaunee Confederacy Chiefs Council (HCCC), also called the Grand Council of the Haudenosaunee Confederacy, (Note: Onondaga: gajyeñha·yeñ’; Seneca: gajísdayë’ transl. where the wampum is) is part of the traditional government of the Haudenosaunee (Iroquois) Confederacy, that unites the Mohawk, Oneida, Onondaga, Cayuga, Seneca and, since 1722, the Tuscarora people.

== History ==
The Haudenosaunee Confederacy Chiefs Council was founded by the Great Peacemaker with the assistance of Aionwatha (Hiawatha) and Jigonhsasee as a means to unite the Mohawk, Oneida, Onondaga, Cayuga, and Seneca nations under a system of peace and collective governance, ensuring that all member nations have a voice in decision-making processes. The exact date of its formation is unknown.

In 2024, the Haudenosaunee Confederacy’s Great Law of Peace was recognized as a finalist for a World Future Policy Award 2024.

== Role ==
The Council operates under its traditional structure and principles, maintaining its identity as a government rooted in Haudenosaunee laws, customs, and treaties. The HCCC prioritizes issues related to land rights, environmental stewardship, spiritual beliefs, language, and cultural preservation. Its core functions include:

- advocating for land rights and protecting Haudenosaunee territories from unauthorized development;
- ensuring adherence to legal obligations related to Haudenosaunee consultation and treaty agreements;
- promoting sustainable land use practices, including the HDI Green Plan, which emphasizes ecological preservation and responsible resource management;
- defending Haudenosaunee sovereignty by engaging with governments and corporations to uphold treaty rights.

=== Foreign relations ===
Over the centuries, the Haudenosaunee Confederacy has played a crucial role in regional governance, treaty negotiations, and advocacy for Haudenosaunee rights:

- The Two Row Wampum Treaty – establishing the principle of coexistence between Haudenosaunee and European nations.
- The Covenant Chain Treaty – strengthening diplomatic relations with colonial governments.
- The Nanfan Treaty (1701) – recognizing Haudenosaunee land rights.

== Structure ==
The governance structure consists of 50 Rotiyanehson (chiefs or Hoyaneh) and six Tuscarora chiefs tasked with resolving disputes and ensuring the welfare of all people within the Confederacy. 49 Clan Mothers (iakoia:ne) representing all the clans (ka‘sä:te) of the member nations oversee the Rotiyanehson and hold power of appointment and recall over their respective Royaner. The Tadodaho has no Clan Mother and acts as presiding officer of the Council.

Today, the seats on the Council are distributed among the Six Nations as follows:

- 14 Onondaga
- 10 Cayuga
- 9 Oneida
- 9 Mohawk
- 8 Seneca
- 6 Tuscarora

The Haudenosaunee use the longhouse as a symbol of their Confederacy, with the constituent nations sitting around a central council fire. Each nation is assigned a metaphorical role within this structure, with the Onondaga serving as the Keepers of the Fire and the Mohawk and Seneca serving as Keepers of the Eastern and Western Door, respectively. The main meeting place is still located at Onondaga, as well as the Six Nations of the Grand River territory.

Business at the Grand Council follows a regular structure, with the Rotiyanehson divided into two moieties. The Mohawk and Seneca are recognized as the Elder Brothers, while the Cayuga (including the Tuscarora) and Oneida are the Younger Brothers in the Grand Council. The Onondaga are also considered Elder Brothers, but occupy a separate role as Firekeepers and mediators.

To initiate debate, the Elder Brother chiefs of the Seneca and Mohawk 'draw' issues from a metaphorical well and pass the issue to the Younger Brother chiefs, who discuss until they reach consensus. The Younger Brother chiefs present their opinion, and the two moieties then discuss as a collective with the aim of reaching a full consensus. Once a consensus is reached, the issue is passed to the Onondaga chiefs, who can confirm the resolution or offer a counterproposal.

Each village and nation also retains its own council, with chiefs selected by their Clan Mothers to oversee internal affairs, while the Grand Council addresses matters impacting the entire Confederacy. These lower councils follow a similar political structure to the Grand Council, with consensus-oriented debate and legislative roles divided among the clans of each community.

== Major initiatives ==
=== The HDI Green Plan ===
A comprehensive framework focusing on renewable energy, sustainable agriculture, and environmental preservation, the HDI Green Plan promotes development that aligns with Haudenosaunee values and ecological balance.

HCCC and HDI have actively opposed various development projects that threaten treaty rights and the environment. The Waterdown Bypass project was halted due to a lack of proper consultation with the Haudenosaunee. Enbridge’s Hamilton Reinforcement Project was challenged by HCCC for failing to consult Haudenosaunee representatives. Similarly, the Ontario Place Redevelopment has been contested for not adhering to Section 35 of the Constitution Act, which protects Haudenosaunee rights. The Volkswagen Group’s Battery Cell Gigafactory has also faced criticism for failing to engage in Nation-to-Nation consultation as required by treaties.

In 2021, the Haudenosaunee Confederacy Chiefs Council (HCCC) declared a development moratorium across the entire Haldimand Tract, citing violations of Haudenosaunee land rights and lack of proper consultation.

=== Haudenosaunee Development Institute’s (HDI) Development Protocol ===
This protocol establishes guidelines for development projects in Haudenosaunee territory, requiring free, prior, and informed consent before any project begins. It also mandates impact assessments considering cultural, social, and environmental effects.
