= Sid Hill =

Onondaga politician, traditionalist, and athlete

- Thadodá·hoʼ
- Tadodaho Sid Hill at the opening ceremony of the 2022 United Nations Biodiversity Conference

Thadodá·hoʼ
- Incumbent
- Assumed office 2002
- Preceded by: Leon Shenandoah

Personal details
- Born: 1951 or 1952
- Citizenship: Haudenosaunee
- Education: Syracuse University
- Profession: Ironworker, lacrosse player
- Sports career
- Country: Haudenosaunee
- Position: Defense
- NCAA team: Syracuse (1972)
- NLA (1974–1975) team: Montreal Quebecois

Sidney Hill (Onondaga: Thadodá·hoʼ) is an Onondaga former lacrosse player, retired ironworker, and current Tadodaho of the Haudenosaunee. As a lacrosse player, Hill was captain of the Haudenosaunee men's national lacrosse team from 1984 to 1990. Condoled as Tadodaho in 2002, he is a leader of the Onondaga Nation and Haudenosaunee Confederacy Chiefs Council as well as a spiritual elder of the Haudenosaunee.

== Early life ==
Hill is a member of the Eel Clan of the Onondaga people. His uncle, Leon Shenandoah, preceded him as Tadodaho.

== Lacrosse career ==
Hill played lacrosse for LaFayette High School. He was named to the 1st Team All-County Lacrosse in 1969 and 1970, becoming co-captain for LaFayette in 1980. Attending Syracuse University from 1971–1972, Hill played for the Syracuse Orange men's lacrosse, where he was leading scorer.

Professionally, Hill briefly played for the Montreal Quebecois as well as the Onondaga Athletic Club. From 1984 to 1990, he played for the Iroquois Nationals, serving as its captain.

In 2023, Hill was inducted into the Upstate Lacrosse Foundation Hall of Fame.

== Tadodaho (2002–present) ==
In 2002, Hill was condoled as Tadodaho. He has been active in land claim cases in New York, by which the Haudenosaunee nations have sought return or compensation for lands they were forced to cede to New York in the aftermath of the American Revolutionary War. The federal courts have upheld some land claim cases.

In 2005, Hill led a group of Onondaga to file papers in United States federal court claiming land ownership over 4,000 square miles (10,000 km^{2}) in Upstate New York. The ownership assertion by the Onondaga included land along Lake Ontario from the Thousand Islands through Syracuse, to the border of Pennsylvania, and including Onondaga Lake. Hill wanted to highlight the desire of his people to see Onondaga Lake restored to environmental health.

In May 2013, Tadodaho Hill sent a letter to several Haudenosaunee communities in an effort to guide their relation to the Confederacy and its traditional principles. He (and others) have opposed the Oneida Indian Nation's May 16, 2013 agreement with New York State that would involve the tribe's putting their land in trust, accepting New York taxes, and additional New York jurisdiction over their affairs, as part of a deal to gain gambling. (According to Doug George-Kanentiio, a Mohawk journalist, this tribe is not officially part of the Haudenosaunee, as it did not exist when the Confederacy was formed.)

In 2015, Hill traveled to the World People’s Conference on Climate Change and Defense of Life in La Paz, Bolivia at the invitation of Bolivian President Evo Morales. The trip resulted in an international incident when Peruvian authorities refused to accept the Haudenosaunee passport on which Hill and his colleagues traveled.

Following an agreement between the Onondaga Nation, New York State, and federal government in 2022, Hill presided over the return of over 1,000 acres of former Honeywell land around the headwaters of Onondaga Creek to the Nation, later receiving New York Governor Kathy Hochul at Onondaga.

Hill has provided traditional Haudenosaunee Thanksgiving Addresses to open proceedings at both state and international institutions, including the United Nations and New York Senate.
