= Tonya Gonnella Frichner =

Native American lawyer and activist

- Born: September 19, 1947; Syracuse, New York
- Died: February 14, 2015 (aged 67)
- Occupations: activist and lawyer
- Known for: Indigenous international work

Tonya Gonnella Frichner (September 19, 1947 – February 14, 2015) was an American activist and lawyer known for her Indigenous international work, particularly for her contributions to the United Nations Declaration on the Rights of Indigenous Peoples.

== Early life and education ==
Tonya Gonnella Frichner was born in Syracuse, New York, on Sept. 19, 1947. Her father, Henry, worked construction and her mother, Maxine, served on the school board, where, as an Onondaga, she sought to promote a Native American curriculum. Maxine and Tonya were citizens of the Onondaga Nation (Snipe Clan), and Maxine's brother was an Onondaga chief.

Frichner graduated from St. John's Catholic Academy, a high school in Syracuse. She earned a Bachelor of Science Degree, magna cum laude, from St. John's University in New York City in 1980 and her Juris Doctor from the City University of New York School of Law in 1987.

== Legal work ==
Shortly after graduating from law school, Frichner served as a delegate for and was of legal counsel to the Haudenosaunee (Iroquois) Confederacy at the UN Sub-Commission on the Human Rights/Working Group on Indigenous Populations in Geneva, Switzerland. Beginning in 1987, she sat on the board of directors and served as legal counsel to the Iroquois Nationals Lacrosse Project, the national team of the Haudenosaunee Confederacy. She served on several other boards, including the Seventh Generation Fund for Indian Development and the Boarding School Healing Project.

In 1989 Frichner founded and served as president of the American Indian Law Alliance, an Indigenous Peoples advocacy group based in New York City. The Alliance is a NGO with Consultative Status to the United Nations Social and Economic Council and Frichner also served a three-year term (2008–2010) as the North American Representative to the United Nations Permanent Forum on Indigenous Issues. She was key in the drafting, negotiations and passage of the United Nations Declaration on the Rights of Indigenous Peoples.

Simultaneously, she taught Federal Indian Law, Human Rights Law and Native American History at several New York City-area colleges and universities, including City College, the City University of New York (1991–1999); Hunter College (1993); New York University (1994); and Manhattanville College (2000–2008).

=== Writing ===
- Frichner, Tonya Gonnella (2010). "The Preliminary Study on the Doctrine of Discovery". Pace Environmental Law Review. 28: 339. doi:10.58948/0738-6206.1664.
- Frichner, Tonya Gonnella (2010). "Impact on Indigenous Peoples of the International Legal construct known as the Doctrine of Discovery, which has served as the Foundation of the Violation of their Human Rights". Preliminary study reported at the Ninth United Nations Permanent Forum on Indigenous Issues, New York.
- Frichner, Tonya Gonnella (1999). "Foreward: Flying Eagle Woman". City University of New York Law Review. 3 (1): 39.
- Frichner, Tonya Gonnella (1999). "Haudenosaunee law, sovereignty and governance". Indigenous Woman. 2 (6): 34–36.
- Frichner, Tonya Gonnella (2010). "The Indian Child Welfare Act: A national law controlling the welfare of Indigenous children". American Indian Law Alliance.
- Frichner, Tonya Gonnella (2010). Impact on Indigenous Peoples of the International Legal Construct Known as the Doctrine of Discovery, Which has Served as the Foundation of the Violation of their Human Rights (E/C. 19/2010/13). Vol. 19. p. 13 – via Economic and Social Council.
- Frichner, Tonya Gonnella. "Special Rapporteur.(2010)". Preliminary Study of the Impact on Indigenous Peoples of the International Legal Construct Known as the Doctrine of Discovery.

== Recognitions and awards ==
She had received numerous awards in recognition of her work, including the Harriet Tubman Humanitarian Achievement Award, the Female Role Model of the Year from the Ms. Foundation for Women, the Thunderbird Indian of the Year Award, the Ellis Island Medal of Honor, the Ingrid Washinawatok El-Issa O’Peqtaw Metaehmoh – Flying Eagle Woman Fund for Peace, Justice, and Sovereignty Award, and the NY County Lawyers Association Award for Outstanding Public Service. She also received an honorary degree from Colby College in 2012. She died February 14, 2015.
