= Tadodaho =

Legendary Haudenosaunee leader and modern head of the Haudenosaunee Grand Council

- Thadodá·hoʼ
- Incumbent; Sid Hill since 2002
- Grand Council of the Haudenosaunee
- Type: Presiding officer; Hoyaneh
- Member of: Haudenosaunee Confederacy Chiefs Council; Onondaga Council
- Seat: Onondaga
- Appointer: Onondaga Clan Mothers
- Term length: Life; (can be recalled by Clan Mother)
- Constituting instrument: Great Law of Peace
- First holder: Tadodaho
- Succession: Condolence by Clan Mothers

Tadodaho (Onondaga: Thadodá·hoʼ) (Note: Cayuga: Tadodá:hoˀ; Seneca: Tadoda:ho’) refers to both a legendary Onondaga leader and a modern condoled chieftainship within the Haudenosaunee Grand Council.

According to Haudenosaunee oral tradition, Tadodaho was a Native American leader of the Onondaga people before the Great Peacemaker and Hiawatha formed the Haudenosaunee Confederacy, or "Iroquois League". According to oral tradition, he had extraordinary characteristics and was widely feared as a sorcerer, but was persuaded by the Peacemaker and Hiawatha to accept the Great Law of Peace. After being healed of his evil ways, he became a founding hoyaneh of the Grand Council, where he was given the role of firekeeper and chair.

The name Tadodaho has been passed on to the Onondaga hoyaneh (chief) chosen to preside over the Grand Council of the Haudenosaunee since the founding of the Confederacy. Seen as the spiritual successor to the original Tadodaho, the position is selected by the 49 other hodiyanéshu, who are in turn selected by the Haudenosaunee Clan Mothers. The Tadodaho is the most influential Haudenosaunee chief and serves as an important political and spiritual leader of the Six Nations. The current Tadodaho is Sid Hill.

== Legend of Tadodaho ==
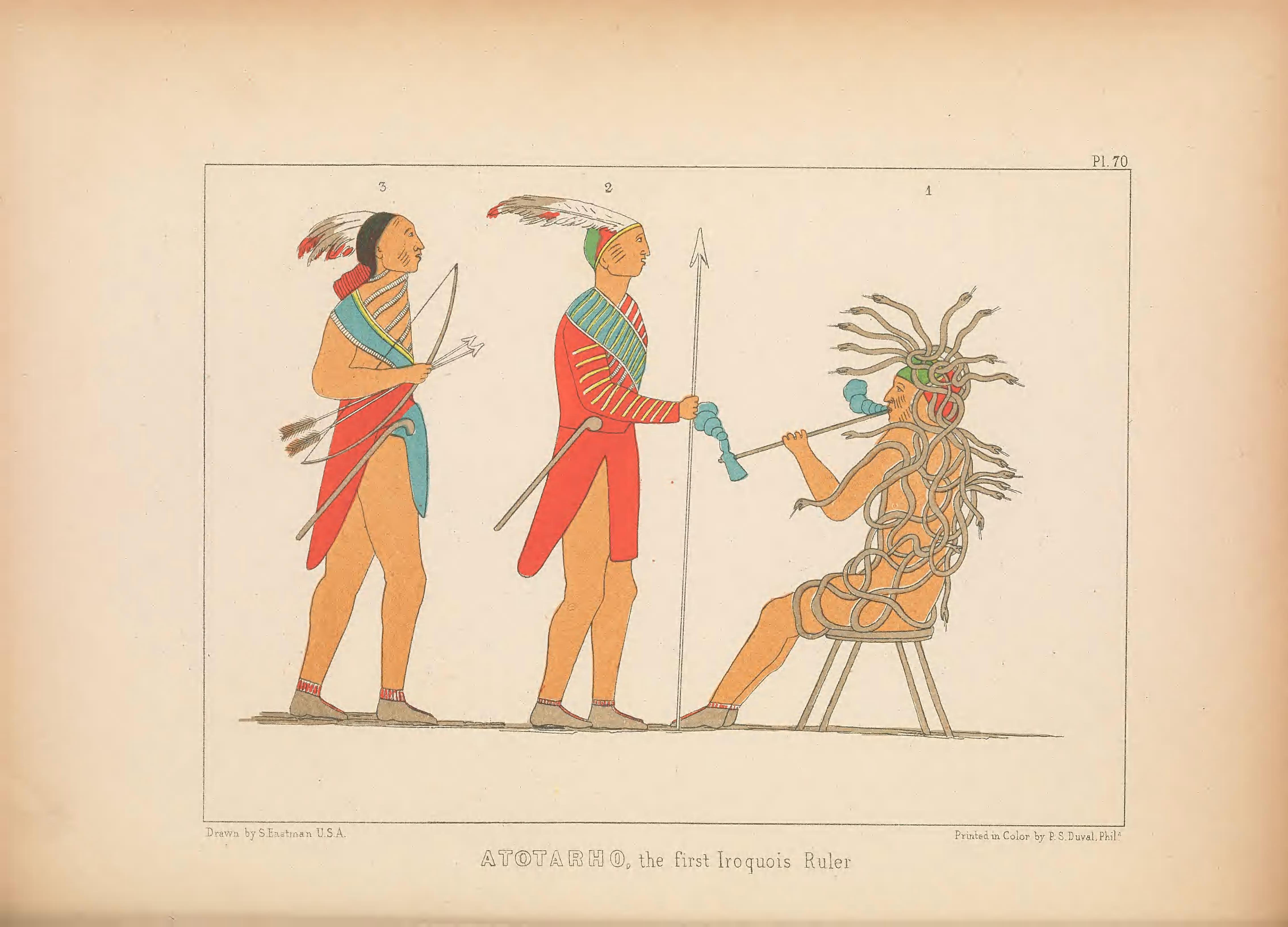
Atotarho, the first Iroquois Ruler (1851) by Seth Eastman

Tadodaho was said to be a warrior and primary chief of the Onondaga people. Depending on the speaker's dialect and the writer's orthography, other versions of the name include Adodarhoh, Atartaho, Atotarho, Tatotarho, Thatotarho, and Watatohtahro. In the 1883 work The Iroquois Book of Rites, edited by Horatio Hale, the term Atartaho is said to signify "entangled". In 1889, J. N. B. Hewitt recounted an Haudenosaunee tale which refers to Tadodaho as a "misshapen monster". Jean Houston and Margaret Rubin write in Manual for the Peacemaker that Tadodaho had "matted and spiky hair", and that this visage lent itself to legends that he had snakes in his hair. He is said to have had a "twisted body" and could kill his enemies from a distance without seeing them. Tadodaho ruled with fear, and his people believed him to be a sorcerer. He scared his own people and threatened other peoples, including the Seneca and Cayuga nations. Tadodaho successfully led his Onondaga in raids against the nearby Cayuga people and traveled west, and attacked the Seneca people.

Peace among the nations of the Haudenosaunee was delayed due to fear of Tadodaho. Deganawidah, of the Huron people, and Hiawatha, of the Onondaga, desired peace among the Haudenosaunee peoples. According to legend, all the chiefs were persuaded except for Tadodaho, who was seen as a hindrance to the Great Law of Peace; he quashed three attempts by Hiawatha to initiate peace discussions among the nations. Hiawatha's daughter died after Tadodaho broke Hiawatha's first attempt to bring together a council, and Hiawatha's second daughter died after Tadodaho foiled the second council. Hiawatha's daughters' deaths were ascribed to Tadodaho's powers. Hiawatha's third daughter died at the council fire of the third meeting, while Tadodaho was present.

Hewitt writes in his 1888 recounting that Hiawatha cried: "All my children are now gone from me; they have been destroyed by Tha-do-da-ho, and he has spoiled our plans. It now behooves me to go among other people. I will start now."

According to Haudenosaunee tradition, Hiawatha and Deganawidah used political and spiritual tactics to garner Tadodaho's support. Hiawatha and Deganawidah walked with the chiefs of the Cayuga, Mohawk, Oneida, and Onondaga peoples to Canandaigua Lake while singing a song called the "Peace Hymn". When they arrived at Canandaigua Lake, they convinced the Seneca people to join their cause of peace. Houston and Rubin recount a statement by Deganawidah, who asserted that he was ready to go meet with Tadodaho at Onondaga Lake and win him over to his mission of peace, saying:

"We must seek the fire and look for the smoke of Tadodaho. He alone stands in our path. His mind is twisted, and there are seven crooks in his body. These must be straightened if the league is to endure."

Hiawatha and Deganawidah consulted with Jigonhsasee, also called Mother of Nations, who advised them how to win Tadodaho to their cause. They used a holy medicine ceremony to soothe Tadodaho and heal his mind and body. In one recounting of the story, Jigonhsasee herself spoke privately with Tadodaho. Hiawatha combed the matted portions out of Tadodaho's hair, and Deganawidah massaged Tadodaho's body with herbs and wampum, and smoothed out the seven crooks in Tadodaho's body. After Tadodaho was healed, he permitted the Onondaga people to join the council of peace. Tadodaho joined the League of the Great Peace and was given the title of "firekeeper" of the confederacy; he was chairman of the council of nations. The final steps toward peace were conducted at Onondaga Lake.

The Tadodaho legend continues to be told in Haudenosaunee society. It has come to refer to the chief who chairs the council of the Onondaga, called Tadodaho. Charles L. Henning writes in the work "Hiawatha and the Onondaga Indians", published in 1902 in the periodical The Open Court:

"...the name Tadodaho remained in the tribe, and when a man was obliged to hold the office of head-chief of the Onondagas, he was always called Tadodaho. The Tadodaho is the only proper man to invite the people to the general council of the five nations, and for this reason he is considered the 'fire keeper,' because the Onondagas were the keepers of the great council fire."

== Position within the Haudenosaunee Grand Council ==
Wampum belt representing the role of Tadodaho

The term Tadodaho is used by the Haudenosaunee to refer to their most influential spiritual leader in New York State; it has been used in this way for centuries. The Tadodaho in New York State is the spiritual leader of the Haudenosaunee, Six Nations that includes the Cayuga, Mohawk, Oneida, Onondaga, Seneca, and Tuscarora people. The post is also called the "Head Chief of All the Six Nations". He presides over the Grand Council of the Haudenosaunee. The Great Council Fire of the Haudenosaunee League is still located within the Onondaga reservation in present-day New York. Many of the Haudenosaunee live in Canada, where their ancestors moved after the American Revolutionary War, as they were allies of the defeated British. The Crown gave them some land in compensation for what they lost.

Along with other Native American leaders, the Tadodaho is responsible for maintaining the history of the Haudenosaunee people. The position of Tadodaho is a lifetime appointment. According to tradition, when the previous Tadodaho dies, a council of chiefs from the Haudenosaunee chooses a leader from the Onondaga people.

== Contemporary leaders and issues ==
As Tadodaho in 1968, George A. Thomas demanded the return to the Haudenosaunee of 25 wampum belts that were held by the New York State Museum. Thomas said:

"it was wrong for our grandfathers to give away the wampum. The wampum tells of old, old agreements and passes on the thoughts of our grandfathers. We would like to see them. Our people would like to touch them."

An anthropologist described the conflict as "the great wampum war", and the issue affected the relationship between the Haudenosaunee people, the New York State Museum, and academia. Thomas had emphasized spiritual leadership and said the wampum belts represented important traditions for the people. This was in the period of Native American activism that led to passage of NAGPRA, federal legislation to protect Native American cultural resources and encourage museums to return remains and grave goods to the nations.

On December 7, 1968, Leon Shenandoah was selected as the next Tadodaho. He worked in daily life as a custodian at Syracuse University. Shenandoah asserted both the political responsibilities and spiritual nature of his role. He opposed any of the Haudenosaunee's entering into gambling enterprises, warning of the moral problems associated with such decisions. He was highly respected for his spiritual leadership and, when he died in 1996, his death was mourned by Native Americans across the United States. He had served as Tadodaho for over 25 years during a period of major changes among the Haudenosaunee and other Native American nations, who have been reasserting sovereignty.

In 2002, Sidney Hill was selected as the Tadodaho. He has been active in land claim cases in New York, by which the Haudenosaunee nations have sought return or compensation for lands they were forced to cede to New York in the aftermath of the American Revolutionary War. The federal courts have upheld some land claim cases.

In 2005, Hill led a group of Onondaga to file papers in United States federal court claiming land ownership over 4,000 square miles (10,000 km^{2}) in Upstate New York. The ownership assertion by the Onondaga included land along Lake Ontario from the Thousand Islands through Syracuse, to the border of Pennsylvania, and including Onondaga Lake. Hill wanted to highlight the desire of his people to see Onondaga Lake restored to environmental health.

In May 2013, Tadodaho Hill sent a letter to several Haudenosaunee communities in an effort to guide their relation to the Confederacy and its traditional principles. He (and others) have opposed the Oneida Nation of New York's May 16, 2013 agreement with New York State that would involve the tribe's putting their land in trust, accepting New York taxes, and additional New York jurisdiction over their affairs, as part of a deal to gain gambling. (According to Doug George-Kanentiio, a Mohawk journalist, this tribe is not officially part of the Haudenosaunee, as it did not exist when the Confederacy was formed.)

== See also ==
- Haudenosaunee Confederacy Chiefs Council
- Haudenosaunee mythology
- Economy of the Haudenosaunee
- Iroquoian languages
- Onondaga language
- Royaner

== Bibliography ==
- Banks, Dennis; Erdoes, Richard (2005), Ojibwa Warrior: Dennis Banks and the Rise of the American Indian Movement, University of Oklahoma Press, pp. 329–332, ISBN 978-0-8061-3691-2
- Barr, Daniel P. (2006), Unconquered: The Iroquois League at War in Colonial America, Greenwood Publishing Group, pp. 9–13, ISBN 0-275-98466-4
- Beauchamp, William Martin (February 1905), A History of the New York Iroquois: Now Commonly Called the Six Nations, University of the State of New York, pp. 156–157, Bulletin 78, Archeology 9
- Carus, Paul (1902), "Hiawatha and the Onondaga Indians, by Charles L. Henning", The Open Court: A Monthly Magazine, vol. XVI, Chicago: The Open Court Publishing Company, pp. 461, 550, 561
- Favor, Lesli J. (2003), The Iroquois Constitution: A Primary Source Investigation of the Law of the Iroquois, The Rosen Publishing Group, pp. 17–22, 25, 27–29, 33, 43–44, ISBN 0-8239-3803-4
- George-Kanentiio, Douglas M. (2006), Iroquois on Fire: A Voice from the Mohawk Nation, Greenwood Publishing Group, pp. 82, 135, ISBN 0-275-98384-6
- Hakim, Joy (2002), The First Americans, Oxford University Press US, pp. 57–58, ISBN 0-19-515319-7
- Hale, Horatio (1883), "The Iroquois Book of Rites", Brinton's Library of Aboriginal American Literature, Number II, Philadelphia: D. G. Brinton, pp. 12–20, 24, 31, 57, 64–65, 124–125, 148, 152, ISBN 1-60506-875-6
- Hauptman, Laurence M. (1988), Formulating American Indian Policy in New York State, 1970–1986, SUNY Press, p. 86, ISBN 0-88706-754-9
- Houston, Jean; Rubin, Margaret (1997), Manual for the Peacemaker: An Iroquois Legend to Heal Self and Society, Quest Books, ISBN 0-8356-0735-6
- Irwin, Lee (2000), Native American Spirituality: A Critical Reader, University of Nebraska Press, pp. 270–271, ISBN 0-8032-8261-3
- Johansen, Bruce Elliott; Mann, Barbara A. (2000), Encyclopedia of the Haudenosaunee (Iroquois Confederacy), Greenwood Publishing Group, p. 249, ISBN 0-313-30880-2
- Landes, Richard Allen (2000), Encyclopedia of Millennialism and Millennial Movements, Taylor & Francis US, pp. 172–173, ISBN 0-415-92246-1
- Lederach, John Paul (2005), The Moral Imagination: The Art and Soul of Building Peace, Oxford University Press US, p. 154, ISBN 0-19-517454-2
- Roza, Greg (2003), The Iroquois of New York, The Rosen Publishing Group, pp. 10, 12–14, ISBN 0-8239-6425-6
