= LaFayette Central School District =

School district in New York, United States

LaFayette Central School District is a school district headquartered in LaFayette, New York.

The district, within Onondaga County, includes most of the Town of LaFayette, plus portions of the towns of Onondaga and Tully. It includes the Onondaga Reservation and a portion of the Nedrow census-designated place.

== History ==
High school instruction in the town of LaFayette began in 1889, and the school received full state accreditation in 1921. The LaFayette Central School District was formed in 1937 through the merger of the LaFayette Union Free High School with several smaller local schools. Additional nearby districts joined the consolidated district in the years that followed. In 1954, the New York State Education Department requested that the district integrate the Onondaga Indian Reservation School, bringing students in grades 7 through 12 from the reservation into the main LaFayette school building.

Laura Lavine was superintendent until her retirement on June 30, 2024. Jeremy Belfield replaced her as superintendent.

In 2021, Belfield, along with the superintendent of the Salmon River Central School District, asked Governor of New York Kathy Hochul for state funding to repair elementary schools which have indigenous populations, including the elementary school on the Onondaga Reservation.

== Schools ==
- LaFayette Junior/Senior High School
- Grimshaw Elementary School
- Onondaga Nation School (K-8 school)
  - The State of New York owns the building and authorizes repairs, while the school district staffs the building and provides operational services. The state government contracts with the school district. The curriculum includes the Onondaga language and culture, and adheres to the guidelines of the New York State Education Department.
- The Big Picture
