= Onondaga Reservation =

Onondaga Nation Onoñ·dá’geh (Onondaga) Ganakdagweñni·yo’geh (Onondaga)
- Indian reservation
- Location within the state of New York
- Coordinates: 42°56′31″N 76°9′21″W
- Country: United States
- State: New York
- Counties: Onondaga

Government
  - Body: Onondaga Council
  - Tadodaho: Sid Hill

Area
  - Total: 9.3 sq mi (24.1 km^{2})
  - Land: 9.3 sq mi (24.0 km^{2})
  - Water: 0.039 sq mi (0.1 km^{2})

Population (2020)
  - Total: 832 (dubious)
  - Density: 89.8/sq mi (34.7/km^{2})
- Time zone: UTC-5 (Eastern (EST))
  - Summer (DST): UTC-4 (EDT)
- Area code: 315
- Website: http://www.onondaganation.org/

Onondaga Reservation (Onondaga: Onoñ·dá’geh, "On the Hill", or Ganakdagweñni·yo’geh, "The Capital") is a Native American reservation in Onondaga County, New York, United States. It is the territory of the Onondaga Nation. It lies just south of the city of Syracuse. The population was 2,244 at the 2010 census, although the accuracy of this number is dubious.

The Onondaga Reservation is a politically independent entity, as the nation is federally recognized by the United States government. The Onondaga Nation has reached some accommodations with New York State on jurisdictional issues.

== Geography ==
According to the United States Census Bureau, the Indian reservation has a total area of 9.3 mi^{2} (24.1 km^{2}). 9.2 mi^{2} (24.0 km^{2}) of it is land and 0.1 square miles (0.26 km^{2}) of it (0.54%) is water.

New York State Route 11A (Onondaga: Ohahahse’geh) is a north-south highway in the reservation. The reservation is bordered by the Town of Onondaga and the Town of LaFayette.

== Demographics ==
Historical population
Census	Pop.	Note	%±
1900	530		—
1910	565		6.6%
1920	475		−15.9%
1930	611		28.6%
1940	762		24.7%
1950	894		17.3%
1960	941		5.3%
1970	785		−16.6%
1980	596		−24.1%
1990	771		29.4%
2000	1,473		91.1%
2010	2,244		52.3%
2020	832		−62.9%
2022 (est.)	824		−1.0%
U.S. Decennial Census

At the 2000 census there were 1,473 people, 304 households, and 292 families residing in the Indian reservation. The population density was 159.2/mi^{2} (61.5/km^{2}). There were 311 housing units at an average density of 33.6/mi^{2} (13.0/km^{2}). The racial makeup of the Indian reservation was 51.8% Native American, 42.8% White, 1.7% Black or African American, 0.2% Pacific Islander, and 3.5% from two or more races. Hispanic or Latino of any race were 0.34%.

Of the 304 households, 85.2% had children under the age of 18 living with them, 57.9% were married couples living together, 15.8% had a female householder with no husband present, and 3.9% were non-families. 1.6% of households were one person, and 0.3% were one person aged 65 or older. The average household size was 4.85 and the average family size was 4.67.

In the Indian reservation, the population was spread out, with 50.2% under the age of 18, 6.6% from 18 to 24, 28.0% from 25 to 44, 11.7% from 45 to 64, and 3.5% 65 or older. The median age was 18 years. For every 100 females, there were 108.6 males. For every 100 females age 18 and over, there were 118.5 males.

The median household income was $65,655 and the median family income was $57,250. Males had a median income of $44,688 versus $28,750 for females. The per capita income for the Indian reservation was $15,425. About 8.6% of families and 7.6% of the population were below the poverty line, including 8.6% of those under age 18 and 4.4% of those age 65 or over.

Many members of the Onondaga Nation decline to participate in the U.S. Census, as they do not consider themselves to be U.S. citizens. Therefore, census reportage of the Onondaga Reservation is notoriously untrustworthy. According to a resident speaking in 2001, at the time she spoke, there had been no non-Native residents on the reservation since 1973.

== Education ==
The property is in the LaFayette Central School District. The district operates the K-8 Onondaga Nation School (Onondaga: Tsha’ Oñdehoñ·nyéñ·nik), with high school students going to LaFayette Junior/Senior High School .

The State of New York owns the Onondaga Nation School building and authorizes repairs, while the school district staffs the building and provides operational services.

The Onondaga Nation School began in the 1850s, and a brick building opened in 1940 after a fire razed the previous wooden building.
