= Royaner =

Title within the Haudenosaunee Confederacy

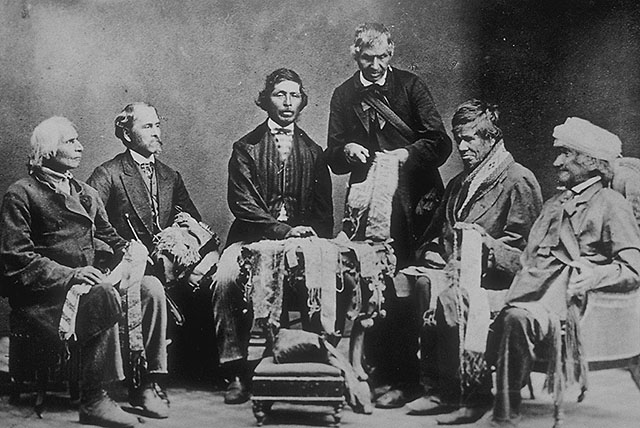
Male leaders of the Haudenosaunee Confederacy at the Grand River in Ontario in 1871, including hereditary Rotiyaneson and non-hereditary leaders.

A Royaner (Note: Mohawk: roiá꞉ner, pl. rotiyanéhrshon; Oneida: loya·nél, pl. lotiyanéshu; Onondaga: hoyá·neh, pl. hodiyanéshuˀ; Cayuga: hoyá꞉neh, pl. hodiyanéhsǫˀ; Seneca: hoya꞉ne:h; Tuscarora: ruyà·ner) (pl.: Rotiyaneson) is any of the fifty hereditary male clan leaders within the Haudenosaunee Confederacy. They are chosen by their respective Yakoyaner (clan mothers) to represent their clan at the Haudenosaunee Grand Council. The specific name-titles held by the Rotiyaneson belong to the matrilineal lineages headed by the clan mothers. These male leaders are expected to serve their community for life, although there are ways of removing a Royaner if he does not live up to his lineage's expectations. With the clan mothers, the Rotiyaneson form the hereditary leadership that distinguishes itself from the elected Band Council and tribal government imposed by the Canadian or American state.

== Etymology ==
The term Royaner (pl.: Rotiyaneson; meaning: "caretakers of peace"), comes from the root word ioánere (meaning nice or good) in the Mohawk language. The term Royaner has a variety of different spellings, including (but not limited to): royaa'nehr, hoyaa'neh,, hoyaneh, yaa'nehr, royanni, roia:ner, and roya’ner. In the constituent languages of the Haudenosaunee, the names are:

- Mohawk: roiá꞉ner, pl. rotiyanéhrshon
- Oneida: loya·nél, pl. lotiyanéshu
- Onondaga: hoyá·neh, pl. hodiyanéshu’
- Cayuga: hoyá꞉neh, pl. hodiyanéhsǫˀ
- Seneca: hoya꞉ne:h
- Tuscarora: ruyà·ner

In published historical accounts, the title of Royaner has often been translated into English as chief, lord or sachem. However, many Haudenosaunee have expressed that those terms are not appropriate as they relay the wrong spirit of the role. Indeed, Royaner is meant to designate a humble leader who is generous materially, psychologically, spiritually and politically, which the English terms are not able to convey.

== Elements of the role ==
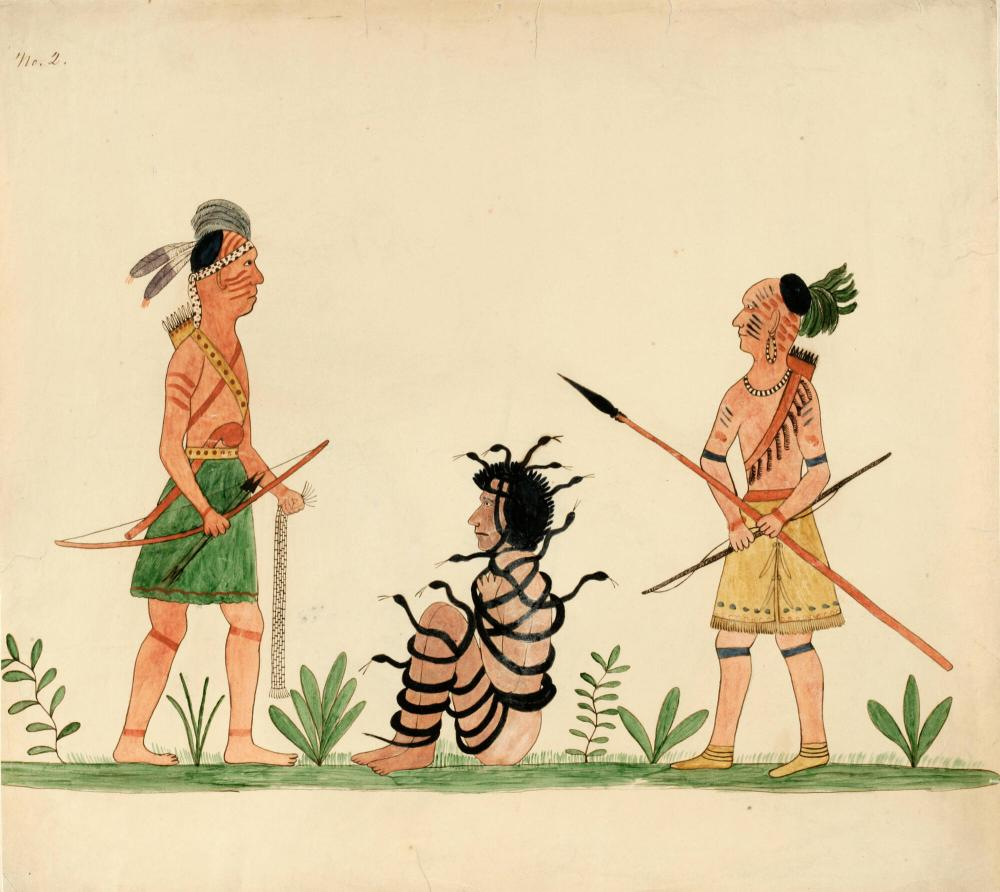
Tadodaho (shown entangled in snakes) became the first Royaner and keeper of the Council Fire after being freed from his bad mind and accepting the Peacekeeper's message.

=== Origins ===
The origins of the Royaner role are rooted in the Great Law of Peace (Kainere'ko:wa), which is the political constitution of the Haudenosaunee confederacy. This political tradition was rooted in a deep desire and need for peace after the Time of the Troubled Nations, which was a time of great violence and war-making among Iroquois nations. The fifty men that accepted the Peacemaker's teachings and formed the original Five Nation Confederacy became the leaders that were entrusted with the confederacy's political and social well-being. Later, in 1722, the Tuscarora people also joined the Haudenosaunee Confederacy, which became known as the Six Nation Confederacy. The Tuscarora do have hereditary leaders in the Confederacy, but they are not included in the original 50 Rotiyaneson.

=== Requickening ===
The 50 Rotiyaneson that exist today are the same, in name and in spirit, as the 50 first leaders that were entrusted with the vital responsibility of peacekeeping. The idea is that the 50 people who created the confederacy are consistently requickened, as to never die and symbolically upkeep the Great Law of Peace forever. After the death of a Royaner, the son chosen by a Yakoyaner who holds a Royaner title goes through a condolence ceremony, and takes the role of the deceased, as well as their name and title. The cycle continues as to make sure that someone will always fill the role of a Royaner. Requickening, in its simplest expression, is the action of overcoming death through the condolence ceremony prescribed by the peacemaker, in which the name and the spirit of the dead will be given to someone else, for the void left by the deceased to be filled. This form of grieving and mourning is engraved in the identity of the Haudenosaunee and is therefore also represented at the leadership level of the Confederacy.

=== Relationship to Clan Mothers ===
Clan Mothers select the Rotiyaneson from among the men of their clan, and the Rotiyaneson serve at the pleasure of their Clan Mother. Clan Mothers have the power to dismiss - symbolically remove the antlers, after three strikes - a Royaner who is not honouring his role. Politically, the Rotiyaneson function as the federal level of government for the Haudenosaunee Confederacy (as they represent nations) while Clan Mothers work at a local level of government, representing clans and the people. The Rotiyaneson are in no way hierarchically superior to the Clan Mothers because they lead on a larger scale. Indeed, the Haudenosaunee Confederacy is known for a horizontal structure of government that promotes a balance of gender roles, where no top-down or vertical structures are present and consensus is prioritized over coercion, effectively the opposite of Western forms of governance. The Clan Mothers and the Rotiyaneson conduct a circular and reciprocal form of governance, where most topics will be discussed between both forms of hereditary leadership as both point of views hold the same value. Among other roles, the Clan Mothers instruct the Rotiyaneson on the opinions of the clan and people and ensure they act in their constituent's best interests.

=== Regalia ===
Rotiyaneson carry strings of wampum as a mark of their office, and wear deer antlers on their headdresses. During the Condolence Council, Rotiyaneson are symbolically crowned with antlers, and, if dismissed by the clan mothers, "dehorned" and returned to private life. The association of antlers with chieftainship extends to modern politics; at Six Nations, those Haudenosaunee who support the Elected Council and oppose the role of traditional chiefs are known as "dehorners".

== Interaction with colonial powers ==
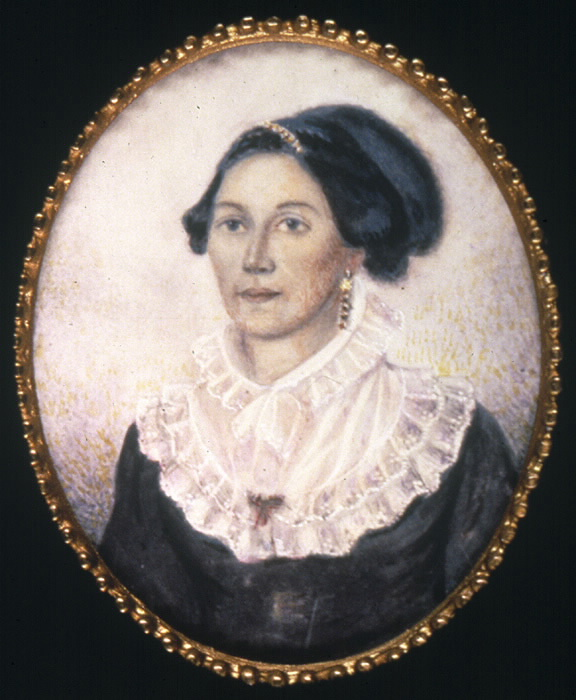
Clan Mother Elizabeth Brant

=== The case of the Brant family ===
Joseph Brant was a Mohawk man who was recognised as a military and political leader by the British Empire. However, he was not a Royaner and therefore was not recognised within Haudenosaunee nation as a rightful and legitimate leader. Nevertheless, when the Mohawk valley was forfeited by the British to the Americans in the Treaty of Paris, and the nation had to relocate, the British approached Joseph Brant to help in finding a suitable new homeland that would replace the lands lost in the war. The Confederacy hereditary leadership (the clan mothers and Rotiyaneson), knowing that Brant was recognized by the Crown as one of their leaders and had standing in the British military, good English language skills and personal connections to the British leadership, allowed him to represent the nation in the negotiations as they felt that he had the most advantageous position to secure a more just compensation. Contrary to many historical representations of Joseph Brant as a "Mohawk tribal chief", he was never given authority to act on behalf of the Haudenosaunee Confederacy. Instead, he simply served as a spokesman for the Confederacy council in the selection of the new Haudenosaunee homeland at the Grand River tract.

Elizabeth Brant was Joseph Brant's daughter, but was also, more importantly, the daughter of Catharine Brant, the Clan Mother responsible for nominating the leading Royaner of the Mohawk (Tehkarihoken). As such, when her mother died in 1837, she inherited the leadership role of Clan Mother and became responsible for nominating the new Tehkarihoken. However, as the British became more and more disinterested in traditional leadership structures and instead turned to patriarchal structures of power, the role of clan mothers was becoming less and less recognized. This growing disregard for the matrilineal hereditary line of leadership pushed Elizabeth Brant to petition the British court in 1844 to have her rights as a clan mother and the rights of her sons as potential future Rotiyaneson recognized. This petition was successful and solidified the Royaner system of governance as a legitimate self-governing body of the Haudenosaunee Confederacy until 1924. This case helps us understand how the legitimacy Elizabeth had in her family as a clan mother and in the eyes of the British Empire as the daughter of Joseph Brant helped her to secure the protection of the Clan Mother and Royaner system of self-governance for the Haudenosaunee Confederacy.

=== Coup of 1924 ===
In 1924, the government of Canada enacted an amendment to the Indian Act, which imposed an elected council structure as the only recognized form of Indigenous leadership among First Nations. Like many previous provisions of the act, this had the purpose of delegitimizing traditional Haudenosaunee leadership. However, this did not stop hereditary leaders from pushing back against the imposition of elected non-legitimate leadership through the preservation of the traditional system of leadership. While the patriarchal structures of power may have disproportionately advantaged male leaders, the Rotiyaneson were the first to push back against the patriarchy to have their clan mothers recognized as legitimate leaders. This continued resistance demonstrates the enduring importance of horizontal leadership structures in the Haudenosaunee Confederacy that are founded on circular and reciprocal forms of governance that help to maintain a balance between genders.

== Contemporary context ==
This system has persevered through time and still exists today. Hereditary forms of leadership still have authority within the Six Nations of the Confederacy to serve in their traditional role of peacekeeping. A notable example of this leadership system in action was the attempt by Cayuga Royaner Deskaheh to demand recognition of full independence for the Haudenosaunee confederacy in front of the League of Nations in Geneva in 1923. Royaner Deskaheh travelled with a Haudenosaunee passport, claiming that his Confederacy is the oldest of its kind, and deserves the same recognition as other nations. This practice of pursuing the recognition of Indigenous People's rights on an international level has persisted and is still advocated by hereditary forms of leadership.

While many modern Haudenosaunee bands have adopted republican governments, often under pressure by the Canadian and American governments, the role of traditional Rotiyanehson-Clan Mother leadership remains strong. For instance, elections for the Six Nations of the Grand River Elected Council in Ontario are marked by low turnout in part due to the widespread belief that the elected council has usurped the role of the traditional leadership. The system of the Rotiyaneson is still followed on the Grand River today. In the United States, division over the role of republican and traditional governance led to the separation of the traditional Tonawanda Seneca Nation from the republican Seneca Nation of Indians. The Onondaga Nation likewise follows traditional governance.

== List of the 50 Rotiyanehson ==
50 Rotinyanehson
| Roll call number | Roster number | Title | Gloss | Clan | Alternative spellings |
Mohawk
| 1 | M-1 | Tekarihó:ken | 'Of two opinions' | Turtle | Tehkarihoken |
| 2 | M-2 | Aionwà:tha | 'Early riser' | Turtle | Ayonwatha |
| 3 | M-3 | Shateʼkarí:wate | 'Equal words' | Turtle | Sadekariwadeh |
| 4 | M-4 | Sharenhó:wane | 'Long branches' | Wolf | Sahrehowaneh |
| 5 | M-5 | Teionhéhkhwen | 'Double life' | Wolf | Deyonhehgiveh |
| 6 | M-6 | Orenrehkó:wa | 'Big floating flower' | Wolf | Orenrehgowah |
| 7 | M-7 | Tehanakarí:ne | 'Dragging antlers' | Bear | Dehharagereneh |
| 8 | M-8 | Rastaweseróntha | 'Enters with rattle' | Bear | Rastawehserondah |
| 9 | M-9 | Shoskoharò:wane | 'Great branch' | Bear | Sosskoharowaneh |
Oneida
| 10 | Oe-1 | Hodatsehdeh | 'Carries quiver' | Wolf | |
| 11 | Oe-2 | Ganohgweʼyo:doh | 'Erect corn cobs' | Wolf | |
| 12 | Oe-3 | Deyohaʼgwe:de | 'Through the clearing' | Wolf | |
| 13 | Oe-4 | Sonohse:s | 'His house is long' | Turtle | |
| 14 | Oe-5 | Thanahak tha | 'Two voices merged' | Turtle | |
| 15 | Oe-6 | Atya’tantha | 'His body topples' | Turtle | |
| 16 | Oe-7 | Dehadahohde:yo | 'Droopy ears' | Bear | |
| 17 | Oe-8 | Hanya’dasa:ye | 'Swallows slowly' | Bear | |
| 18 | Oe-9 | Howatsadehoh | 'Covered' | Bear | |
Onondaga
| 19 | Oa-1 | Thadodá·hoʼ | 'Entangled' | Eel | Tadodahoh |
| 20 | Oa-2 | Honeʼsä́·hę·ʼ | 'Ties up something' | Wolf | Gane’se:he: |
| 21 | Oa-3 | Dehatgáhdųs | 'Looking about' | Beaver | Dehatgahdos |
| 22 | Oa-4 | Sganyaʼdají·wak | 'His dark throat' | Wolf | Honya’daji:wak |
| 23 | Oa-5 | Aweʼgę́hyat | 'On the surface' | Wolf | Awe’ge,hyat |
| 24 | Oa-6 | Dehayaʼtgwá·ih | 'Half his body' | Turtle | Dehayatgwae |
| 25 | Oa-7 | Honųwiyéhdih | 'He conceals something' | Wolf | Honowiyehdi |
| 26 | Oa-8 | Gowanęʼsę́·dųh | 'Hanging object' | Deer | Gawe,ne,se,:doh |
| 27 | Oa-9 | Hahí·hųh | 'Spills it' | Deer | Hahi:hoh |
| 28 | Oa-10 | Hoyų·nyę·níh | 'He made it for him' | Eel | Hoyo:ny,nih: |
| 29 | Oa-11 | Shodegwá·jiʼ | 'Bruiser' | Eel | Sodegwa:se,: |
| 30 | Oa-12 | Shagogę́he·ʼ | 'He saw the people' | Eel | Sagoge,he: |
| 31 | Oa-13 | Sä·há·wih | 'Carries an ax' | Deer | Sä·há·hwih or Se,:ha:wi: |
| 32 | Oa-14 | Sgana·wá·dih | 'Over the swamp' | Turtle | Sganawadih |
Cayuga
| 33 | C-1 | Hagáˀę:yǫh | 'He Looks Both Ways' or 'Wonders' | Bear | Haga’e,yok |
| 34 | C-2 | Gajiˀnǫdáwe̱heh | 'Coming On Its Knees' | Deer | Gaji’nodawehe |
| 35 | C-3 | Gadagwá:sęh | 'It Is Bruised' or 'Mashed' | Bear | Gada:gwa:se |
| 36 | C-4 | Shoyǫ́:we:s | 'He Has Long Wampum', 'He Has a Long Intestine Again', or 'His long guts' | Bear | Soyo:wi:s |
| 37 | C-5 | Hagyáˀdrǫ̱hneˀ | 'He Will Put Bodies One on Top of the Other' or 'He repeats it' | Turtle | Hagya;drohne |
| 38 | C-6 | Deyǫhyǫ́:go: | 'Reaches the sky' | Wolf | Dyohyo:goh |
| 39 | C-7 | Deyotowéhgǫh | 'Doubly cold' | Wolf | Deyotowehgoh |
| 40 | C-8 | Deyohǫwé:tǫ:ˀ | 'Mossy Place' or 'Two events' | Snipe | Deyohowe:to |
| 41 | C-9 | Hadǫdá:hehaˀ | 'Putting It On Top' or 'He starts' | Heron | Hadoda:he:ha’ |
| 42 | C-10 | Dehsgáhe:ˀ | 'Not Sitting on It Any Longer' or 'More than eleven' | Bear | Desgahe |
Seneca
| 43 | S-1 | Sganyodaiyoʼ | 'Handsome lake' | Turtle | Sganyadeae:yo |
| 44 | S-2 | Tsaʼdegë́ö́ye:s | 'Level skies' | Snipe | Shaʼdegë́ö́ye:s or Tsa’degaohyes |
| 45 | S-3 | Shogë́ʼdzo:wa:ʼ | 'Great forehead' | Hawk | Sag,’jo:wa |
| 46 | S-4 | Gaʼnogaeh | 'The arrow makes a noise' | Turtle | Ga’nogae |
| 47 | S-5 | Níshanye:në’t | 'They Staggered' or 'Falling day' | Snipe | Nishayene<nha |
| 48 | S-6 | Shajenöwöʼs | 'He helps' or 'Grasps it' | Bear | Sadyenawat |
| 49 | S-7 | Ganö́hgí:ʼdawiʼ | 'Hair singed off' | Snipe | Ganohgi’da:wi |
| 50 | S-8 | Dó:nihogä́:ʼwëh | 'Door keeper' | Wolf | Dyoninho’ga’we |
