= Yakoyaner =

Haudenosaunee clan mother

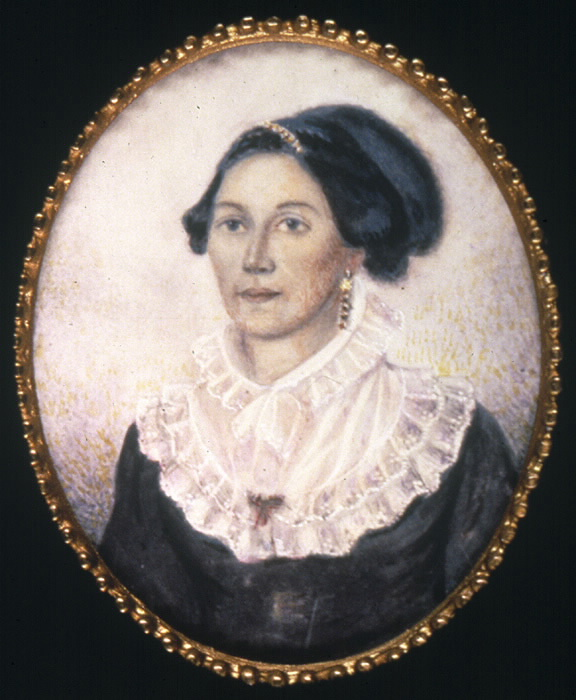
Elizabeth Brant, known Yakoyaner of the Six Nations of the Grand River

The Yakoyaner (Note: Mohawk: iakoiá꞉ner; Oneida: laothuwisʌ́tslaˀ or kutiyanéshu; Onondaga: goyá·neh; Cayuga: goyá꞉neh; Tuscarora: ukuwanáˀtha) (also spelt Iakoiane) is a Kanien'kehá꞉ka (Mohawk) term for the clan mother of the Haudenosaunee. The Yakoyaner are typically senior women responsible for overseeing the clan's political, economic, and social stability. The Yakoyaner, also known as a clan mother, holds weight over their community, family and aids, in guiding the clan's Royaner (chief) in matters of governance, diplomacy, and community affairs.

In the constituent languages of the Haudenosaunee, the clan mothers are known as:

- Mohawk: iakoiá꞉ner
- Oneida: laothuwisʌ́tslaˀ or kutiyanéshu
- Onondaga: goyá·neh
- Cayuga: goyá꞉neh
- Tuscarora: ukuwanáˀtha

== Matrilineal organization and gender roles ==
The Haudenosaunee Confederacy is centred on matrilineal organization, meaning that Haudenosaunee kinship grows from the female line. In Haudenosaunee society, an individual's identity was closely linked to their matrilineal roots. Due to the propinquity between land and identity, territorial boundaries and property ownership were also determined through matrilineage.

Women played a crucial role in the political and social stability of the clan. Married couples lived in the longhouse of the female's relative, where the wife had complete control over the longhouse and maintained all its belongings. Haudenosaunee society's central focus is on balance. One reason why women were revered in Haudenosaunee society was because creation myths attributed the discovery of the world to a woman, Atahensic (Sky Woman), who brought seeds with her. Thus women were given the honour of growing and harvesting crops, especially the luminary Three Sisters; corn, squash, and beans.

Women oversaw the longhouses, communal agriculture, and cooking while men took charge of hunting, clearing the fields, and were the primary builders of the longhouses–demonstrating gender complementarity.

A similar balance is shown in their political sphere, as while all Royaner (male clan leaders) were men, the Yakoyaner and other women within the clan elected them. Female councils entertained issues first; then they were sent to the men's committee. Furthermore, women monitored officials and held the right to impeach any person found unworthy of political office.

Finally, women were central to the Haudenosaunee religion. Women served on an equal basis with men as Keepers of Faith to uplift Haudenosaunee spirituality and culture. Women managed religious festivals and supervised tribe worship. Women called and managed seasonal festivals, typically centred around sacred crops.

The title of Clan Mother is passed down along hereditary lines, going first to an oldest sister. If there is no older sister, then the title is given to the oldest daughter. In addition to selecting Royaner, Clan Mothers also name children in the clan and make sure that when two people are married, they are not from the same clan. According to the Confederacy's history, the first Clan Mother was Jigonsaseh, who, along with Hiawatha and the Great Peacemaker, created the Haudenosaunee government around the 12th century. The leader of the Clan Mothers is named after her.

== Elements of the role ==
=== Creation and removal ===
While Haudenosaunee society does not have a designated group of elders, clan mothers are considered people of wisdom and experience. A nomination process rests on the oldest female relative of the deceased chief, nominations first formed from his maternal grandmother and great aunts. Although, if they are not living, the role is passed down to his mother or aunts and then on. However, to maintain stability in most families, the Yakoyaner herself chooses the successor, typically a daughter, and trains them in the required duties and knowledge. The position of Yakoyaner is tied to the role of the chief. As a result, the process of removing her resembles the removal of a clan chief. Suppose a clan mother is not fulfilling her responsibilities; her female family member will present warnings, but if she does not heed or feel remorseful, the matter of removal is voiced to the chief to be confirmed.

The Yakoyaner are "the holders of knowledge" and "are chosen by their clans because they exhibit the good mind." The Kanien'kehá:ka people regard the Yakoyaner as an important link between the past and the present, and she is seen as a symbol of the continuity and strength of Kanien'kehá:ka culture and traditions. As a keeper of the clan's traditions, the Yakoyaner is responsible for passing down the culture, beliefs, and stories of the Kanien'kehá:ka people to future generations. Put succinctly, "the reason why the women are the heads of clans is that we [Kanien'kehá:ka] look at nature and we [Kanien'kehá:ka] see that women are the creators." Furthermore, "in [Kanien'kehá:ka] mythology, the women were created first, and came from the earth," and therefore, women "bring forth life" and have the role of "the anchor of the society." In Kanien'kehá:ka beliefs, culture, and stories, "the earth literally is mother," and as such, "becomes mother in a figurative sense, through the support she provides to all life." This connection between viewing both the earth and the Yakoyaner as mother has constituted the foundational framework on which the Kanien'kehá:ka people's matricentric social, cultural, and political system rests.

=== Duties ===
The responsibilities of the clan mother within the broader Haudenosaunee clan system were developed out of the Great Law of Peace (Mohawk: Kaianere'kó:wa), or Gayanashagowa.

The clan mother's general obligation is to supervise the clan's interests. They also have specific economic duties, such as monitoring the public treasury. The Yakoyaner also has several duties related to her clan and the law, specifically concerning family continuity. She is responsible for maintaining the order of the clan's family names. She is consulted alongside other women in naming a new child–ensuring that no child takes on the name of a living person. The clan mothers are also responsible for "adopting" or requickening new members into their families. Adoption is codified within the legal provisions of the Great Law, and can apply to the adoption of individuals, groups, and entire nations into clans and nations under the Haudenosaunee Confederacy. In times of war, Yakoyaners were allowed to integrate prisoners or refugees into their family systems to replace deceased relatives–to expand the territory and population and fulfill roles within the community.

In addition, the clan mother's work focuses on observing the chiefs in the council and providing guidance when they do not perform their duties or forget the importance of the work. Yakoyaners represented the interests of their clan by selecting a chief to speak on their behalf at the Confederacy council. Yakoyaners also had the authority to oust a chief if he led insufficiently. Their responsibility extends to ensuring that the chiefs' mental, physical, and spiritual welfare is fulfilled by feeding the chiefs in council. Women had domain over the gardens and were the economic source of their community, and thus preparing meals for the council was a reminder of their monetary authority. Most importantly, like the chief, the Yakoyaners also serve as mentors to provide harmony by counselling families and ensuring the children are safe and healthy.

Another responsibility of the clan mother is relaying the Creation Story to her community, particularly to the youth. This is done with the intention of rooting them in tradition and culture, and encouraging them to be involved with the community. The Yakoyaner telling the Creation Story with this intention encultures individuals into Haudenosaunee customs and values, ensuring they are passed along to the next generation.

=== Qualifications ===
To qualify for the role of Yakoyaner, one must be married to someone of an opposite clan, know the language of her corresponding nation, and have daughters. Daughters of former clan mothers cannot uphold this title without meeting these requirements, even though they may be qualified through direct inheritance.

== Diplomacy ==
European and Haudenosaunee sources have indicated that while diplomacy was primarily the domain of men, Yakoyaners were partially responsible for declarations of war. Yakoyaners often accompanied Rotiyaneson (chiefs) to Confederacy council meetings and diplomacy talks, in addition to attending their own local councils. The Yakoyaners play a crucial role in the administration of the Confederacy since they choose and supervise the Rotiyaneson who sit on the Grand Council. Each of the Kanien'kehá:ka Yakoyaners "have the most influence" in selecting the chiefs who will represent the clan in the Grand Council of the Haudenosaunee.

During land and treaty negotiations, Yakoyaners often travelled with Rotiyaneson and served as mediators or appointed a male speaker to represent them. Yakoyaners were of particular importance in negotiations over land due to the role of women as cultivators and the linkage between land and matrilineage. In diplomatic settings, British officials including Sir William Johnson reported the influence of Yakoyaners and strove to win their favour.

== List of current Clan Mothers ==
As of 24 August 2026 the following are the Clan Mothers for the various nations of the Haudenosaunee.

Nation	Clan	Clan Mother	Royaner Title	Chief (English name)
Seneca	Bear	Linda Logan	Shajenöwöʼs	Darren Jimerson
Seneca	Hawk	Luanne Jamieson	Shogë́ʼdzo:wa:ʼ	Vacant
Seneca	Snipe	Janet Hill	Ganö́hgí:ʼdawiʼ	Roger Hill
Seneca	Snipe	Vacant	Níshanye:në’t	Vacant
Seneca	Snipe	Vacant	Tsaʼdegë́ö́ye:s	Vacant
Seneca	Turtle	Darlene J	Gaʼnogaeh	Emerson "Amo" Webster
Seneca	Turtle	Darlene Jonathan	Sganyodaiyoʼ	Vacant
Seneca	Wolf	Evelyn Jonathan	Dó:nihogä́:ʼwëh	Kenny Jonathan

Nation	Clan	Clan Mother	Chief Title	Chief (English name)
Cayuga	Bear	Carol Jacobs	Dehsgáhe:ˀ	Steve Jacobs
Cayuga	Bear	Pam Tallchief	Shoyǫ́:we:s	Samuel George
Cayuga	Bear	Cora Harris	Gada:gwa:se	Andrew Warner
Cayuga	Bear	Kathy Smoke	Hagáˀę:yǫh	Chris Smoke (B.W.)
Cayuga	Deer	Janace Henry	Gajiˀnǫdáwe̱heh	Steve Maracle
Cayuga	Heron	Vacant	Hadǫdá:hehaˀ	William C. Jacobs
Cayuga	Snipe	Teresa Silversmith	Deyohǫwé:tǫ:ˀ	Roger Silversmith
Cayuga	Turtle	Julie Bomberry	Hagyáˀdrǫ̱hneˀ	Blake Bomberry
Cayuga	Wolf	Lori Froman	Deyotowéhgǫh	Markus Doxtater (B.W.)
Cayuga	Wolf	Vacant	Deyǫhyǫ́:go:	Vacant

Nation	Clan	Clan Mother	Chief Title	Chief (English name)
Tuscarora	Beaver			Vacant
Tuscarora	All clans	Lena Rickard	Sekwaríˀθre· (Sagwaritha)	Brennen Ferguson
Tuscarora				Tom Jonathan

Nation	Clan	Clan Mother	Chief Title	Chief (English name)
Onondaga	Beaver	Crystal Laforme	Dehatgáhdųs	Cleve Thomas
Onondaga	Deer	Vacant	Sä·há·wih	Vacant
Onondaga	Deer	Samantha Miller	Hahí·hųh	Butch Clause
Onondaga	Deer	Amy Silversmith	Gowanęʼsę́·dųh	Mike Powless
Onondaga	Eel	Karen Webster	Shagogę́he·ʼ	Vacant
Onondaga	Eel	Virginia Abrams	Shodegwá·jiʼ	Shannon Booth
Onondaga	Eel		Thadodá·hoʼ	Sidney Hill
Onondaga	Hawk	Francine Bush	Hoyų·nyę·níh	Spencer Lyons
Onondaga	Turtle	Eileen Jacobs	Sgana·wá·dih	Arnold Jacobs
Onondaga	Turtle	Vacant	Dehayaʼtgwá·ih	Vacant
Onondaga	Wolf	Josetta Skye	Honųwiyéhdih	Alson (Aly) Gibson
Onondaga	Wolf	Lucille Jamieson	Aweʼgę́hyat	Andrew Williams (Toby)
Onondaga	Wolf	Ruby Williams	Sganyaʼdají·wak	Perry Williams (Yogi)
Onondaga	Wolf	Sharon Williams	Honeʼsä́·hę·ʼ	Bill Williams (B.W.)

Nation	Clan	Clan Mother	Chief Title	Chief (English name)
Oneida	Bear	Mable Doxtator	Dehadahohde:yo	Robert Brown
Oneida	Bear	Andrea Chrisjohn	Hanya'dasa:ye	Luke Doxtator
Oneida	Bear	Mary Sandy	Howatsadehoh	Vacant
Oneida	Turtle	Jill Green	Sonohse:s	Alfred Day
Oneida	Turtle	Marla Summers	Thanahak tha	Artley Skenandore
Oneida	Turtle	Deanna Chrisjohn	Atya'tantha	Arnold Hill
Oneida	Wolf	Beatrice Nicholas	Hodatsehdeh	Lod^unt Honyust (B.W)
Oneida	Wolf	Joanne Summers	Ganohgwe'yo:doh	George Doxtator
Oneida	Wolf	Dawn Chrisjohn	Deyoha'gwe:de	Alfred Doxtator

Nation	Clan	Clan Mother	Chief Title	Chief (English name)
Mohawk	Bear	Louise McDonald-Herne	Tehanakarí:ne	Curtis Nelson
Mohawk	Bear	Vacant	Rastaweseróntha	Vacant
Mohawk	Bear	Vacant	Shoskoharò:wane	Vacant
Mohawk	Turtle	Vacant	Tekarihó:ken	Allen MacNaughton
Mohawk	Turtle	Vacant	Aionwà:tha	Vacant
Mohawk	Turtle	Vacant	Shateʼkarí:wate	Vacant
Mohawk	Wolf	Angela Elijah	Sharenhó:wane	Ernest David
Mohawk	Wolf	Vacant	Teionhéhkhwen	Vacant
Mohawk	Wolf	Julia Jacobs	Orenrehkó:wa	Howard Thompson

== See also ==
- Native American women in politics
