= History of the Haudenosaunee =

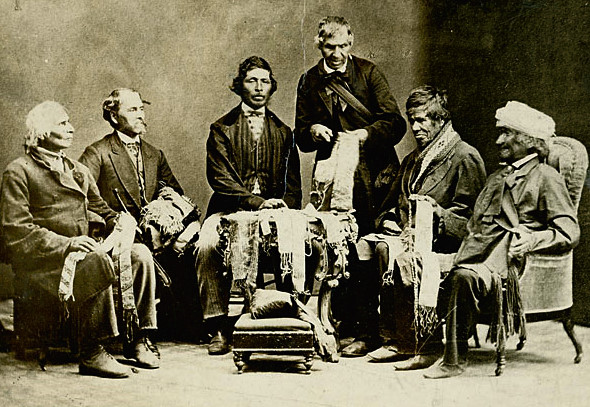
Chiefs of the Six Nations of the Haudenosaunee, explaining their wampum belts in September 1871.

The history of the Haudenosaunee, or history of the Iroquois, goes back to the formation of the league around 1450. Since then the Haudenosaunee and their history have played an important role in the histories of the United States and Canada.

== Historiography ==
Knowledge of Haudenosaunee history stems from Haudenosaunee oral tradition, archaeological evidence, accounts from Jesuit missionaries, and subsequent European historians. Historian Scott Stevens credits the early modern European value of written sources over oral tradition as contributing to a racialized, prejudiced perspective about the Haudenosaunee through the 19th century. The historiography of the Haudenosaunee peoples is a topic of much debate, especially regarding the American colonial period.

French Jesuit accounts of the Haudenosaunee portrayed them as savages lacking government, law, letters, and religion. But the Jesuits made considerable effort to study their languages and cultures, and some came to respect them. A source of confusion for European sources, coming from a patriarchal society, was the matrilineal kinship system of Haudenosaunee society and the related power of women. The Canadian historian D. Peter MacLeod wrote about the Canadian Haudenosaunee and the French in the time of the Seven Years' War:

Most critically, the importance of clan mothers, who possessed considerable economic and political power within Canadian Iroquois communities, was blithely overlooked by patriarchal European scribes. Those references that do exist, show clan mothers meeting in council with their male counterparts to take decisions regarding war and peace and joining in delegations to confront the Onontio [the Haudenosaunee term for the French governor-general] and the French leadership in Montreal, but only hint at the real influence wielded by these women.

Jesuit missionaries wrote historical accounts of their experiences, even if they did not fully understand what they were seeing. One Jesuit account in 1641 reported on how a Neutral Nations war party of about 2,000 warriors attacked an enemy village (of Mascouten) in southern Michigan, taking 170 women and children captive. Historians interpret such attacks to have been part of a "Mourning War", a type of warfare among the Haudenosaunee and other nations where small raiding parties would attack enemy villages and bring back people they captured, in order to cope with a sudden grief or loss within their own group, which would lead to a ceremony to replace their lost loved ones, called the "requickening". Archaeological evidence suggests conflict between the Mascoutens and Neutrals existed for two centuries prior to the mid-1600s.

Eighteenth-century English historiography focuses on the diplomatic relations with the Haudenosaunee, supplemented by such images as John Verelst's Four Mohawk Kings, and publications such as the Anglo-Iroquoian treaty proceedings printed by Benjamin Franklin. A persistent 19th and 20th century narrative casts the Haudenosaunee as "an expansive military and political power ... [who] subjugated their enemies by violent force and for almost two centuries acted as the fulcrum in the balance of power in colonial North America".

Historian Scott Stevens noted that the Haudenosaunee themselves began to influence the writing of their history in the 19th century, including Joseph Brant (Mohawk), and David Cusick (Tuscarora, c.1780–1840). John Arthur Gibson (Seneca, 1850–1912) was an important figure of his generation in recounting versions of Haudenosaunee history in epics on the Peacemaker. Notable women historians among the Haudenosaunee emerged in the following decades, including Laura "Minnie" Kellogg (Oneida, 1880–1949) and Alice Lee Jemison (Seneca, 1901–1964).

== Formation of the League ==
Map of the New York tribes before European arrival: Iroquoian tribes Algonquian tribes

The Haudenosaunee League was established prior to European contact, with the banding together of five of the many Iroquoian peoples who had emerged south of the Great Lakes. (Note: The American Heritage encyclopedia relates that Europeans learned about many interior tribes through the names given them by the Algonquian-speaking coastal tribes they encountered first, who referred to enemies in terms reflecting their competitive relationship. The editors add, that Iroquois was a polite name from such people, and its meaning is 'from the south', people of the south, or such similar name.) Many archaeologists and anthropologists believe that the League was formed about 1450, though arguments have been made for an earlier date. One theory argues that the League formed shortly after a solar eclipse on August 31, 1142, an event thought to be expressed in oral tradition about the League's origins. Some sources link an early origin of the Haudenosaunee confederacy to the adoption of corn as a staple crop.

Archaeologist Dean Snow argues that the archaeological evidence does not support a date earlier than 1450. He has said that recent claims for a much earlier date "may be for contemporary political purposes". Other scholars note that anthropological researchers consulted only male informants, thus losing the half of the historical story told in the distinct oral traditions of women. For this reason, origin tales tend to emphasize the two men Deganawidah and Hiawatha, while the woman Jigonsaseh, who plays a prominent role in the female tradition, remains largely unknown.

The founders of League are traditionally held to be Dekanawida the Great Peacemaker, Hiawatha, and Jigonhsasee the Mother of Nations, whose home acted as a sort of United Nations. They brought the Peacemaker's Great Law of Peace to the squabbling Iroquoian nations who were fighting, raiding, and feuding with each other and with other tribes, both Algonkian and Iroquoian. Five nations originally joined in the League, giving rise to the many historic references to "Five Nations of the Haudenosaunee". (Note: The American Heritage Book of Indians states that oral tradition recounts that other Iroquoian peoples were given the opportunity to join the league.) With the addition of the southern Tuscarora in the 18th century, these original five tribes still compose the Haudenosaunee in the early 21st century: the Mohawk, Onondaga, Oneida, Cayuga, and Seneca.

According to legend, an evil Onondaga chieftain named Tadodaho was the last converted to the ways of peace by The Great Peacemaker and Hiawatha. He was offered the position as the titular chair of the League's Council, representing the unity of all nations of the League. This is said to have occurred at Onondaga Lake near present-day Syracuse, New York. The title Tadodaho is still used for the League's chair, the fiftieth chief who sits with the Onondaga in council.

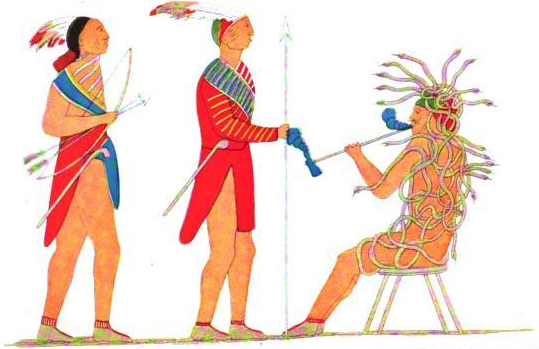
Haudenosaunee painting of Tadodaho receiving two Mohawk chiefs

The Haudenosaunee subsequently created a highly egalitarian society. One British colonial administrator declared in 1749 that the Haudenosaunee had "such absolute Notions of Liberty that they allow no Kind of Superiority of one over another, and banish all Servitude from their Territories". As raids between the member tribes ended and they directed warfare against competitors, the Haudenosaunee increased in numbers while their rivals declined. The political cohesion of the Haudenosaunee rapidly became one of the strongest forces in 17th- and 18th-century northeastern North America.

The League's Council of Fifty ruled on disputes and sought consensus. However, the confederacy did not speak for all five tribes, which continued to act independently and form their own war bands. Around 1678, the council began to exert more power in negotiations with the colonial governments of Pennsylvania and New York, and the Haudenosaunee became very adroit at diplomacy, playing off the French against the British as individual tribes had earlier played the Swedes, Dutch, and English.

Iroquoian-language peoples were involved in warfare and trading with nearby members of the Haudenosaunee League. The explorer Robert La Salle in the 17th century identified the Mosopelea as among the Ohio Valley peoples defeated by the Haudenosaunee in the early 1670s. The Erie and peoples of the upper Allegheny valley declined earlier during the Beaver Wars. By 1676 the power of the Susquehannock (Note: The 'fierce' Susquehannock declined rapidly following three years of epidemic disease in 1670–1672. They had been a regional military power, having subjugated several Delaware tribes and defeated two tribes of the Iroquois between 1665 and 1667.) was broken from the effects of three years of epidemic disease, war with the Haudenosaunee, and frontier battles, as settlers took advantage of the weakened tribe.

In early Haudenosaunee history, after becoming united in the League, the Haudenosaunee invaded the Ohio River Valley in the territories that would become the Ohio Country down as far as present-day Kentucky to seek additional hunting grounds. They displaced about 1,200 Mosopelea from the Ohio River valley. The Mosopelea migrated to regions along the Mississippi River.

During the Beaver Wars, many neighboring nations, such as the Erie and Neutrals, went extinct as tribes because neighboring tribes and the Haudenosaunee themselves adopted survivors. The Editors of American Heritage Book of Indians said that one French observer hypothesized that by the end of 1678, the adoptees may have outnumbered native-born tribesmen due to the decades of intertribal warfare. During that time frame, the Iroquois had repeated clashes with French-supported Algonquian tribes, seeking control over the fur trade. In addition, they defeated the Wendat and Susquehannock peoples. They did not join the League when invited, and were greatly reduced due to the Beaver Wars and high mortality from Eurasian infectious diseases. While the indigenous nations sometimes tried to remain neutral or play both sides in the various colonial frontier wars, some also allied with Europeans, as in the French and Indian War, the North American front of the Seven Years' War. The Six Nations played both sides in their alliances between the French and British in that war.

=== Expansion ===
In Reflections in Bullough's Pond, historian Diana Muir argues that the pre-contact Haudenosaunee were an imperialist, expansionist culture whose cultivation of the corn/beans/squash agricultural complex enabled them to support a large population. They made war primarily against neighboring Algonquian peoples. Muir uses archaeological data to argue that the Haudenosaunee expansion onto Algonquian lands was checked by the Algonquian adoption of agriculture. This enabled them to support their own populations large enough to resist Haudenosaunee conquest. The People of the Confederacy dispute this historical interpretation, regarding the League of the Great Peace as the foundation of their heritage.

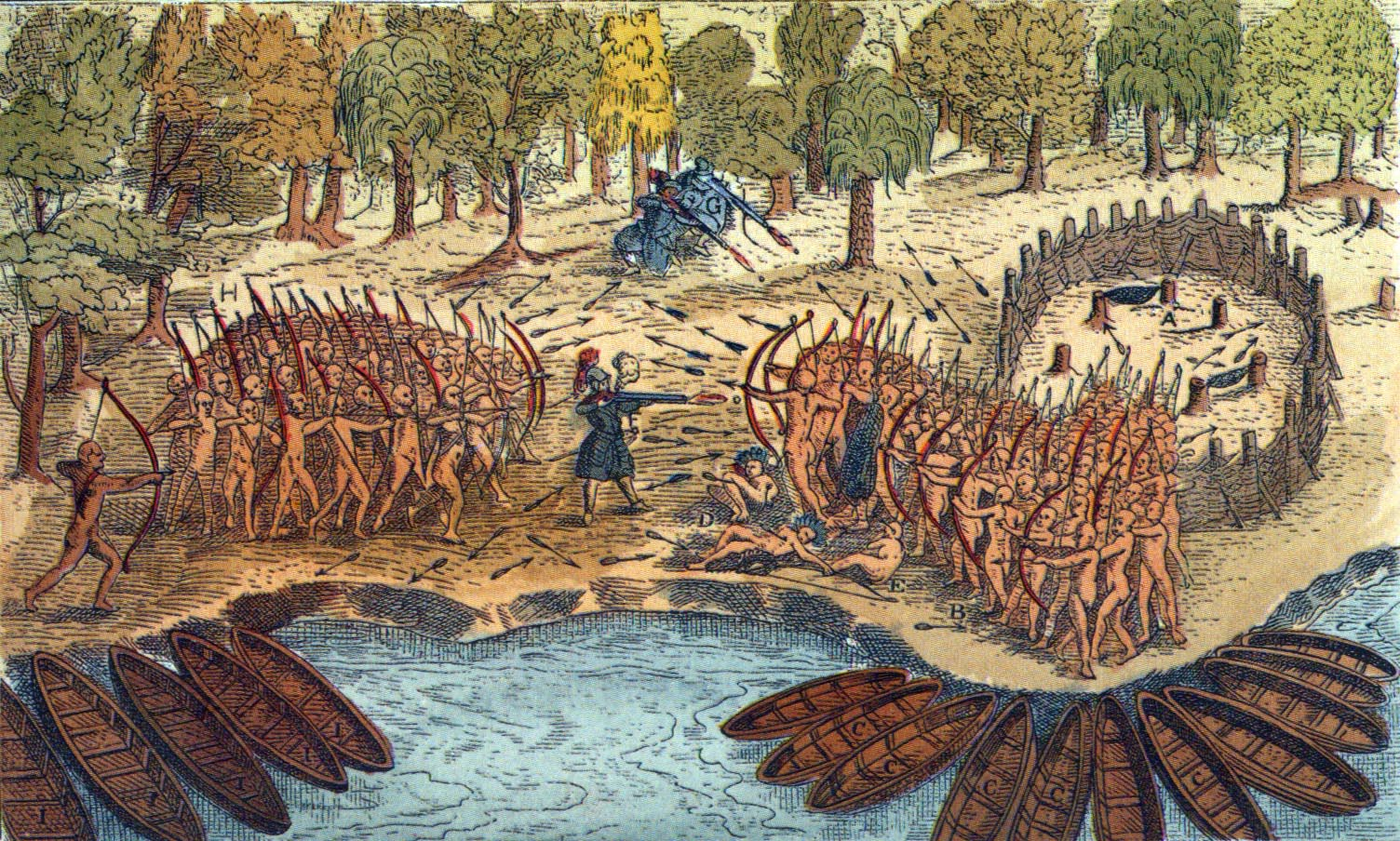
Engraving based on a drawing by Champlain of his 1609 voyage. It depicts a battle between Haudenosaunee and Algonquian tribes near Lake Champlain, with participation by Samuel de Champlain's forces.

The Haudenosaunee may be the Kwedech described in the oral legends of the Mi'kmaq nation of Eastern Canada. These legends relate that the Mi'kmaq in the late pre-contact period had gradually driven their enemies – the Kwedech – westward across New Brunswick, and finally out of the Lower St. Lawrence River region. The Mi'kmaq named the last-conquered land Gespedeg or "last land", from which the French derived Gaspé. The "Kwedech" are generally considered to have been Haudenosaunee, specifically the Mohawk; their expulsion from Gaspé by the Mi'kmaq has been estimated as occurring c. 1535–1600.

Around 1535, Jacques Cartier reported Iroquoian-speaking groups on the Gaspé peninsula and along the St. Lawrence River. Archeologists and anthropologists have defined the St. Lawrence Iroquoians as a distinct and separate group (and possibly several discrete groups), living in the villages of Hochelaga and others nearby (near present-day Montreal), which had been visited by Cartier. By 1608, when Samuel de Champlain visited the area, that part of the St. Lawrence River valley had no settlements, but was controlled by the Mohawk as a hunting ground. The fate of the Iroquoian people that Cartier encountered remains a mystery, and all that can be stated for certain is when Champlain arrived, they were gone. On the Gaspé peninsula, Champlain encountered Algonquian-speaking groups. The precise identity of any of these groups is still debated. On July 29, 1609, Champlain assisted his allies in defeating a Mohawk war party by the shores of what is now called Lake Champlain, and again in June 1610, Champlain fought against the Mohawks.

The Haudenosaunee became well known in the southern colonies during the 17th century. After the first English settlement in Jamestown, Virginia (1607), numerous 17th-century accounts describe a powerful people known to the French as the Antouhonoron. They were said to come from the north, beyond the Susquehannock territory. Historians have often identified the Antouhonoron as the Haudenosaunee.

In 1649 as part of the Beaver Wars, an Haudenosaunee war party, consisting mostly of Senecas and Mohawks, destroyed the Huron nation. With no northern enemy remaining, the Haudenosaunee turned their forces on the Neutral Nations on the north shore of Lakes Erie and Ontario, and the Susquehannocks, their southern neighbor. Then they destroyed other Iroquoian-language tribes, including the Erie, to the west, in 1654, over competition for the fur trade. Then they destroyed the Mohicans. After their victories, they reigned supreme in an area from the Mississippi River to the Atlantic Ocean; from the St. Lawrence River to the Chesapeake Bay.

Michael O. Varhola has argued their success in conquering and subduing surrounding nations had paradoxically weakened a Native response to European growth, thereby becoming victims of their own success.

The Five Nations of the League established a trading relationship with the Dutch at Fort Orange (modern Albany, New York), trading furs for European goods, an economic relationship that profoundly changed their way of life and led to much over-hunting of beavers.

Between 1665 and 1670, the Haudenosaunee established seven villages on the northern shores of Lake Ontario in present-day Ontario, collectively known as the "Haudenosaunee du Nord" villages. The villages were all abandoned by 1701.

Over the years 1670–1710, the Five Nations achieved political dominance of much of Virginia west of the Fall Line and extending to the Ohio River valley in present-day West Virginia and Kentucky. As a result of the Beaver Wars, they pushed the local tribes out and reserved their territories as hunting grounds. They finally sold to British colonists their remaining claim to the lands south of the Ohio in 1768 at the Treaty of Fort Stanwix.

Historian Pekka Hämäläinen writes of the League, "There had never been anything like the Five Nations League in North America. No other Indigenous nation or confederacy had ever reached so far, conducted such an ambitious foreign policy, or commanded such fear and respect. The Five Nations blended diplomacy, intimidation, and violence as the circumstances dictated, creating a measured instability that only they could navigate. Their guiding principle was to avoid becoming attached to any single colony, which would restrict their options and risk exposure to external manipulation."

== Society at time of contact ==
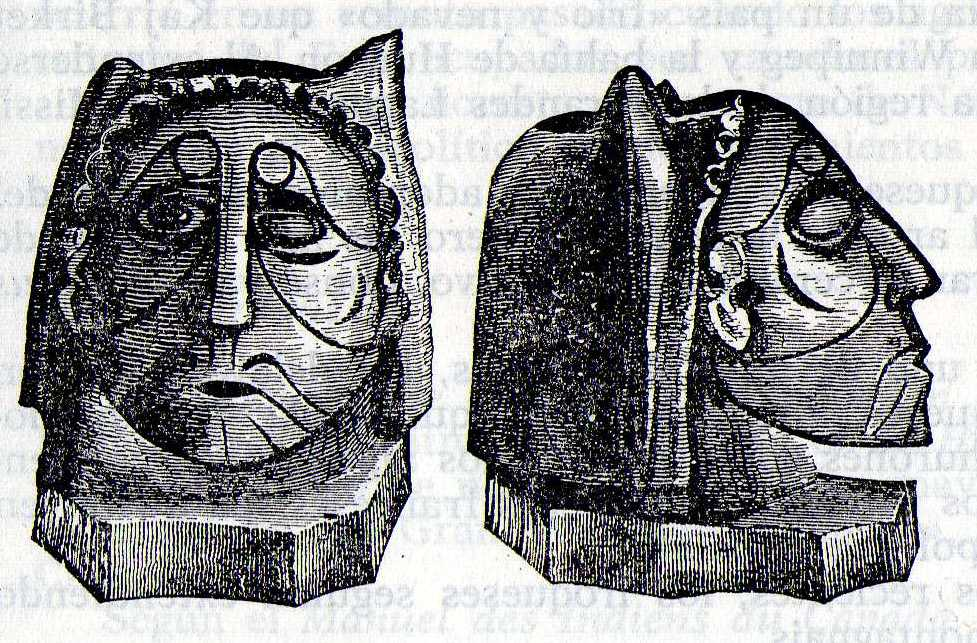
Stone pipe (19th-century engraving)

=== Food production ===
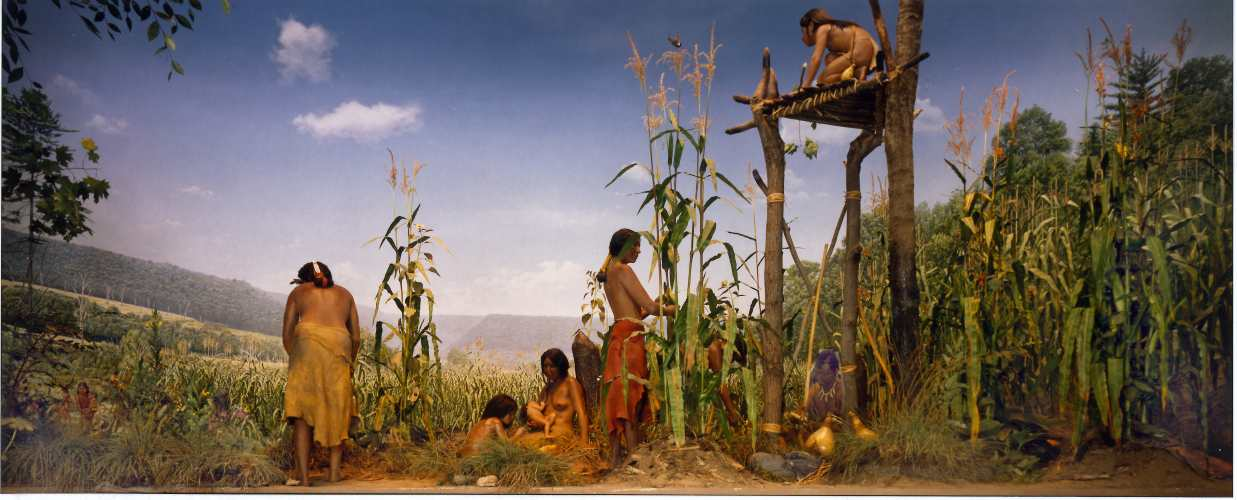
A diorama of The Three Sisters (corn, beans, and squash) on display in A Mohawk Iroquois Village, an exhibit at the New York State Museum.

The Haudenosaunee are a mix of horticulturalists, farmers, fishers, gatherers and hunters, though traditionally their main diet has come from farming. For the Haudenosaunee, farming was traditionally women's work and the entire process of planting, maintaining, harvesting and cooking was done by women. Gathering has also traditionally been the job of women and children. Wild roots, greens, berries and nuts were gathered in the summer. During spring, sap is tapped from the maple trees and boiled into maple syrup, and herbs are gathered for medicine. After the coming of Europeans, the Haudenosaunee started to grow apples, pears, cherries, and peaches.

Historically, the main crops cultivated by the Haudenosaunee were corn, beans, and squash, which were called the three sisters (De-oh-há-ko) and in Haudenosaunee tradition were considered special gifts from the Creator. These three crops could be ground up into hominy and soups in clay pots (later replaced by metal pots after contact with Europeans). Besides the "Three Sisters", the Haudenosaunee diet also included artichokes, leeks, cucumbers, turnips, pumpkins, a number of different berries such blackberries, blueberries, gooseberries, etc., and wild nuts. Ramson, a species of wild onion, is also a part of traditional Haudenosaunee cuisine, as well as northern redcurrant, American groundnut, and broadleaf toothwort.

Using these ingredients they prepared meals of boiled cornbread and cornmeal sweetened with maple syrup, known today as Indian pudding. Cornmeal was also used to make samp, a type of porridge with beans and dried meat. Reports from early American settlers mention Haudenosaunee extracting corn syrup that was used as a sweetener for cornmeal dumplings.

The Haudenosaunee hunted mostly deer but also other game such as wild turkey and migratory birds. Muskrat and beaver were hunted during the winter. Archaeologists have found the bones of bison, elk, deer, bear, raccoon, and porcupines at Haudenosaunee villages. Fishing was also a significant source of food because the Haudenosaunee had villages mostly in the St. Lawrence and Great Lakes areas. The Haudenosaunee used nets made from vegetable fiber with weights of pebbles for fishing. They fished salmon, trout, bass, perch and whitefish until the St. Lawrence became too polluted by industry. In the spring the Haudenosaunee netted, and in the winter fishing holes were made in the ice. Starting about 1620, the Haudenosaunee started to raise pigs, geese and chickens, which they had acquired from the Dutch.

=== Melting pot ===
The Haudenosaunee League traditions allowed for the dead to be symbolically replaced through captives taken in "mourning wars", the blood feuds and vendettas that were an essential aspect of Haudenosaunee culture. As a way of expediting the mourning process, raids were conducted to take vengeance and seize captives. Captives were generally adopted directly by the grieving family to replace the member(s) who had been lost.

This process not only allowed the Haudenosaunee to maintain their own numbers, but also to disperse and assimilate their enemies. The adoption of conquered peoples, especially during the period of the Beaver Wars (1609–1701), meant that the Haudenosaunee League was composed largely of naturalized members of other tribes. Cadwallader Colden wrote,

It has been a constant maxim with the Five Nations, to save children and young men of the people they conquer, to adopt them into their own Nation, and to educate them as their own children, without distinction; These young people soon forget their own country and nation and by this policy the Five Nations make up the losses which their nation suffers by the people they lose in war.

Those who attempted to return to their families were harshly punished; for instance, the French fur trader Pierre-Esprit Radisson was captured by an Haudenosaunee raiding party as a teenager, was adopted by a Mohawk family, and ran away to return to his family in Trois-Rivières. When he was recaptured, he was punished by having his fingernails pulled out and having one of his fingers cut to the bone. But Radisson was not executed, as his adoptive parents provided gifts to the families of the men whom Radisson had killed when he escaped, given as compensation for their loss. Several Huron who escaped with Radisson were recaptured and quickly executed.

By 1668, two-thirds of the Oneida village were assimilated Algonquian and Huron. At Onondaga there were Native Americans of seven different nations, and among the Seneca eleven. They also adopted European captives, as did the Catholic Mohawk in settlements outside Montreal. This tradition of adoption and assimilation was common to native people of the Northeast.

=== Settlement ===
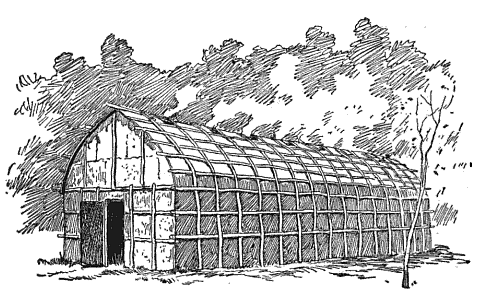
Traditional Haudenosaunee longhouse

At the time of first European contact the Haudenosaunee lived in a small number of large villages scattered throughout their territory. Each nation had between one and four villages at any one time, and villages were moved approximately every five to twenty years as soil and firewood were depleted. These settlements were surrounded by a palisade and usually located in a defensible area such as a hill, with access to water. Because of their appearance with the palisade, Europeans termed them castles. Villages were usually built on level or raised ground, surrounded by log palisades and sometimes ditches.

Within the villages the inhabitants lived in longhouses. Longhouses varied in size from 15 to 150 feet (4.57 to 45.7 m) long and 15 to 25 feet (4.57 to 7.62 m) in breadth. Longhouses were usually built of layers of elm bark on a frame of rafters and standing logs raised upright. In 1653, Dutch official and landowner Adriaen van der Donck described a Mohawk longhouse in his Description of New Netherland:

Their houses are mostly of one and the same shape, without any special embellishment or remarkable design. When building a house, large or small,—for sometimes they build them as long as some hundred feet, though never more than twenty feet wide—they stick long, thin, peeled hickory poles in the ground, as wide apart and as long as the house is to be. The poles are then bent over and fastened one to another, so that it looks like a wagon or arbor as are put in gardens. Next, strips like split laths are laid across these poles from one end to the other. ... This is then well covered all over with very tough bark. ... From one end of the house to the other along the center they kindle fires, and the area left open, which is also in the middle, serves as a chimney to release the smoke. Often there are sixteen or eighteen families in a house ... This means that often a hundred or a hundred and fifty or more lodge in one house.

Usually, between 2 and 20 families lived in a single longhouse with sleeping platforms being 2 feet above the ground and food left to dry on the rafters. A castle might contain twenty or thirty longhouses. In addition to the castles the Haudenosaunee also had smaller settlements which might be occupied seasonally by smaller groups, for example for fishing or hunting. Living in the smoke-filled longhouses often caused conjunctivitis.

Total population for the five nations has been estimated at 20,000 before 1634. After 1635 the population dropped to around 6,800, chiefly due to the epidemic of smallpox introduced by contact with European settlers. The Haudenosaunee lived in extended families that were grouped into moieties ("halves"). Each moiety was divided into clans, which were headed by clan mothers. The typical clan consisted of about 50 to 200 people. The division of the Haudenosaunee went as follows:

- Cayuga
  - Moiety (A) clans: Bear, Beaver, Heron, Turtle, Wolf
  - Moiety (B) clans: Turtle, Bear, Deer
- Tuscarora
  - Moiety (A) clans: Bear, Wolf
  - Moiety (B) clans: Eel, Snipe, Beaver, Turtle, Deer
- Seneca
  - Moiety (A) clans: Heron, Beaver, Bear, Wolf, Turtle
  - Moiety (B) clans: Deer, Hawk, Eel, Snipe
- Onondaga
  - Moiety (A) clans: Tortoise, Wolf, Snipe, Eagle, Beaver
  - Moiety (B) clans: Bear, Hawk, Eel, Deer
- Oneida
  - Moiety (A) clan: Wolf
  - Moiety (B) clans: Bear, Turtle
- Mohawk
  - Moiety (A) clans: Wolf, Bear
  - Moiety (B) clan: Turtle

Government was by the 50 Royaner (chiefs) representing the various clans who were chosen by the clan mothers. Assisting the Royaner were the "Pinetree Chiefs" who serve as diplomats and the "War Chiefs" who led the war parties; neither the "Pinetree Chiefs" or the "War Chiefs" were allowed to vote at council meetings.

By the late 1700s The Haudenosaunee were building smaller log cabins resembling those of the colonists, but retaining some native features, such as bark roofs with smoke holes and a central fireplace. The main woods used by the Haudenosaunee to make their utensils were oak, birch, hickory and elm. Bones and antlers were used to make hunting and fishing equipment.

=== Cannibalism ===
Although the Haudenosaunee are sometimes mentioned as examples of groups who practiced cannibalism, the evidence is mixed as to whether such a practice could be said to be widespread among the Six Nations, and to whether it was a notable cultural feature. Some anthropologists have found evidence of ritual torture and cannibalism at Haudenosaunee sites, for example, among the Onondaga in the sixteenth century. However, other scholars, such as anthropologist William Arens in his controversial book, The Man-Eating Myth, have challenged the evidence, suggesting the human bones found at sites point to funerary practices, asserting that if cannibalism was practiced among the Haudenosaunee, it was not widespread. Modern anthropologists seem to accept the probability that cannibalism did exist among the Haudenosaunee, with Thomas Abler describing the evidence from the Jesuit Relations and archaeology as making a "case for cannibalism in early historic times ... so strong that it cannot be doubted." Scholars are also urged to remember the context for a practice that now shocks the modern Western society. Sanday reminds us that the ferocity of the Haudenosaunee's rituals "cannot be separated from the severity of conditions ... where death from hunger, disease, and warfare became a way of life".

The missionaries Johannes Megapolensis, François-Joseph Bressani, and the fur trader Pierre-Esprit Radisson present first-hand accounts of cannibalism among the Mohawk. A common theme is ritualistic roasting and eating the heart of a captive who has been tortured and killed. "To eat your enemy is to perform an extreme form of physical dominance."

=== Slavery ===
Haudenosaunee peoples participated in "mourning wars" to obtain captives. Leland Donald suggests that captives and slaves were interchangeable roles. There have been archaeological studies to support that Haudenosaunee peoples did in fact have a hierarchical system that included slaves. The term 'slave' in Haudenosaunee culture is identified by spiritual and revengeful purposes, not to be mistaken for the term in the African slave trade. However, once African slavery was introduced into North America by European settlers, some Haudenosaunee, such as Mohawk chief Joseph Brant, owned African slaves.

Slaves brought onto Haudenosaunee territory were mainly adopted into families or kin groups that had lost a person. Even so, if that person had been vital for the community, they "were usually replaced by other kin-group members" and "captives were ... adopted to fill lesser places". During adoption rituals, slaves were to reject their former life and be renamed as part of their "genuine assimilation". The key goal of Haudenosaunee slavery practices was to have slaves assimilate to Haudenosaunee culture to rebuild population after one or many deaths. Children and Indigenous peoples of villages neighbouring the Haudenosaunee are said to have been good slaves because of their better ability to assimilate. In any case the role of a slave was not a limited position, and whenever slaves were available for capture they were taken, no matter their age, race, gender etc.

Once adopted, slaves in Haudenosaunee communities had some potential to move up in society. Since slaves were replacing dead nation members, they took on the role of that former member if they could prove that they could live up to it. Their rights within the aforementioned framework were still limited though, meaning slaves performed chores or labor for their adoptive families. Also, there are a few cases where slaves were never adopted into families and their only role was to perform tasks in the village. These types of slaves might have been used solely for exchange.

Slaves were often tortured once captured by the Haudenosaunee. Torture methods consisted of, most notably, finger mutilation, among other things. Slaves endured torture not only on their journey back to Haudenosaunee nations, but also during initiation rituals and sometimes throughout their enslavement. Finger mutilation was common as a sort of marking of a slave. In "Northern Iroquoian Slavery", Starna and Watkins suggest that sometimes torture was so brutal that captives died before being adopted. Initial torture upon entry into the Haudenosaunee culture also involved binding, bodily mutilation with weapons, and starvation. Starvation may have lasted longer depending on the circumstance. Louis Hennepin was captured by Haudenosaunee peoples in the 17th century and recalled being starved during his adoption as one of "Aquipaguetin's" replacement sons. Indigenous slaves were also starved by their captors, as Hennepin was. The brutality of Haudenosaunee slavery was not without its purposes; torture was used to demonstrate a power dynamic between the slave and the "master" to constantly remind the slave that they were inferior.

Language played another role in Haudenosaunee slavery practices. Slaves were often referred to as "domestic animals" or "dogs" being equivalent to the word for "slave". This terminology suggests that slaves were dehumanized, "domesticated" or perhaps even eaten as Haudenosaunee peoples ate dogs. Jacques Bruyas wrote a dictionary of the Mohawk language where the word gatsennen is defined as "Animal domestique, serviteur, esclave" (English: "domestic animal, butler, slave"). There are also more accounts of slaves being compared to animals (mostly dogs), composed in the Oneida and Onondaga languages. This nomenclature serves as a proof not only that slavery did exist, but also that slaves were at the bottom of the hierarchy.

Haudenosaunee slavery practices changed after European contact. With the arrival of European-introduced infectious diseases, came an increase in Haudenosaunee peoples taking captives, as their population kept decreasing. During the 17th century, Haudenosaunee peoples banded together to stand against settlers. By the end of the century, Haudenosaunee populations were made up mostly of captives from other nations. Among the Indigenous groups targeted by the Haudenosaunee were the Wyandot, who were captured in such large numbers that they lost their independence for a long period of time. "Mourning wars" became essential to rebuilding their numbers, while at the same time Haudenosaunee warriors began launching raids on European colonial settlements. Similarly to Indigenous slaves, European slaves were tortured by the Haudenosaunee using finger mutilation and sometimes cannibalism. European captives did not make good slaves because they resisted even more than Indigenous captives, and did not understand rituals such as renaming and forgetting their past. For this reason most European captives were either used as ransom or murdered upon arrival to Haudenosaunee territory. Many Europeans who were not captured became trading partners with the Haudenosaunee. Indigenous slaves were now being traded among European settlers, and some slaves even ended up in Quebec households. Eventually, European contact led to adoptees outnumbering the Haudenosaunee in their own communities. The difficulty of controlling these slaves in large numbers ended Haudenosaunee slavery practices.

=== Medicine ===
Both male and female healers were knowledgeable in the use of herbs to treat illness, and could dress wounds, set broken bones, and perform surgery. Illness was believed to have a spiritual as well as a natural component, so spells, dances, ceremonies were used in addition to more practical treatments. There are three types of practitioners of traditional medicine: The "Indian doctor" or healer, who emphasizes the physical aspect of curing illness, the fortune-teller, who uses spiritual means to determine the cause of the patient's ailments and the appropriate cure, and the witch.

It was believed that knowledge of healing was given by supernatural creatures in the guise of animals.

=== Sports and games ===
At time of contact, the favorite sport of the Haudenosaunee was lacrosse (O-tä-dä-jish′-quä-äge in Seneca). A version was played between two teams of six or eight players, made up of members of two sets of clans (Wolf, Bear, Beaver, and Turtle on one side vs. Deer, Snipe, Heron, and Hawk on the other among the Senecas). The goals were two sets of poles roughly 450 yards (410 m) apart. (Note: Morgan: "eighty rods") The poles were about 10 feet (3.0 m) high and placed about 15 feet (4.6 m) apart. (Note: "three rods") A goal was scored by carrying or throwing a deer-skin ball between the goal posts using netted sticks—touching the ball with hands was prohibited. The game was played to a score of five or seven.

A popular winter game was the snow-snake game. The "snake" was a hickory pole about 5–7 feet (1.5–2.1 m) long and about .25 inches (0.64 cm) in diameter, turned up slightly at the front and weighted with lead. The game was played between two sides of up to six players each, often boys, but occasionally between the men of two clans. The snake, or Gawa′sa, was held by placing the index finger against the back end and balancing it on the thumb and other fingers. It was not thrown but slid across the surface of the snow. The side whose snake went the farthest scored one point. Other snakes from the same side which went farther than any other snake of the opposing side also scored a point; the other side scored nothing. This was repeated until one side scored the number of points which had been agreed to for the game, usually seven or ten.

The Peach-stone game (Guskä′eh) was a gambling game in which the clans bet against each other. Traditionally it was played on the final day of the Green Corn, Harvest, and Mid-winter festivals. The game was played using a wooden bowl about one foot in diameter and six peach-stones (pits) ground to oval shape and burned black on one side. A "bank" of beans, usually 100, was used to keep score and the winner was the side who won them all. To play the peach stones were put into the bowl and shaken. Winning combinations were five of either color or six of either color showing.

== 17th century ==
=== Beaver Wars ===
Beginning in 1609, the League engaged in the decades-long Beaver Wars against the French, their Huron allies, and other neighboring tribes, including the Petun, Erie, and Susquehannock. Trying to control access to game for the lucrative fur trade, they invaded the Algonquian peoples of the Atlantic coast (the Lenape, or Delaware), the Anishinaabe of the boreal Canadian Shield region, and not infrequently the English colonies as well. During the Beaver Wars, they were said to have defeated and assimilated the Huron (1649), Petun (1650), the Neutral Nation (1651), Erie Tribe (1657), and Susquehannock (1680). The traditional view is that these wars were a way to control the lucrative fur trade to purchase European goods on which they had become dependent. Starna questions this view.

Recent scholarship has elaborated on this view, arguing that the Beaver Wars were an escalation of the Iroquoian tradition of "Mourning Wars". This view suggests that the Haudenosaunee launched large-scale attacks against neighboring tribes to avenge or replace the many dead from battles and smallpox epidemics.

In 1628, the Mohawk defeated the Mahican to gain a monopoly in the fur trade with the Dutch at Fort Orange (present-day Albany), New Netherland. The Mohawk would not allow northern native peoples to trade with the Dutch. By 1640, there were almost no beavers left on their lands, reducing the Haudenosaunee to middlemen in the fur trade between Indian peoples to the west and north, and Europeans eager for the valuable thick beaver pelts. In 1645, a tentative peace was forged between the Haudenosaunee and the Huron, Algonquin, and French.

In 1646, Jesuit missionaries at Sainte-Marie among the Hurons went as envoys to the Mohawk lands to protect the precarious peace. Mohawk attitudes toward the peace soured while the Jesuits were traveling, and their warriors attacked the party en route. The missionaries were taken to Ossernenon (near present-day Auriesville, New York), where the moderate Turtle and Wolf clans recommended setting them free, but angry members of the Bear clan killed Jean de Lalande and Isaac Jogues on October 18, 1646. The Catholic Church has commemorated the two French priests and Jesuit lay brother René Goupil (killed September 29, 1642) as among the eight North American Martyrs.

In 1649, the Haudenosaunee used recently purchased Dutch guns to attack the Huron, allies of the French. These attacks, primarily against the Huron towns of Taenhatentaron (St. Ignace) and St. Louis in what is now Simcoe County, Ontario, were the final battles that effectively destroyed the Huron Confederacy. The Jesuit missions in Huronia on the shores of Georgian Bay were abandoned in the face of the Haudenosaunee attacks, with the Jesuits leading the surviving Hurons east towards the French settlements on the St. Lawrence. The Jesuit Relations expressed some amazement that the Five Nations had been able to dominate the area "for five hundred leagues around, although their numbers are very small". From 1651 to 1652, the Haudenosaunee attacked the Susquehannock, to their south in present-day Pennsylvania, without sustained success.

The war waged by the Haudenosaunee against the Huron has been described as genocidal. Of the 30,000 Hurons, a few thousand were able to flee and avoid becoming victims of the ethnic genocide. Historian Ned Blackhawk, in analysing the war between the Haudenosaunee and Huron, found that the Haudenosaunee committed all five acts described in the 1948 Genocide Convention.

In 1653 the Onondaga Nation extended a peace invitation to New France. An expedition of Jesuits, led by Simon Le Moyne, established Sainte Marie de Ganentaa in 1656 in their territory. They were forced to abandon the mission by 1658 as hostilities resumed, possibly because of the sudden death of 500 native people from an epidemic of smallpox, a European infectious disease to which they had no immunity.

From 1658 to 1663, the Haudenosaunee were at war with the Susquehannock and their Lenape and Province of Maryland allies. In 1663, a large Haudenosaunee invasion force was defeated at the Susquehannock main fort. In 1663, the Haudenosaunee were at war with the Sokoki tribe of the upper Connecticut River. Smallpox struck again, and through the effects of disease, famine, and war, the Haudenosaunee were under threat of extinction. In 1664, an Oneida party struck at allies of the Susquehannock on Chesapeake Bay.

In 1665, three of the Five Nations made peace with the French. The following year, the Governor-General of New France, the Marquis de Tracy, sent the Carignan regiment to confront the Mohawk and Oneida. The Mohawk avoided battle, but the French burned their villages, which they referred to as "castles", and their crops. In 1667, the remaining two Haudenosaunee Nations signed a peace treaty with the French and agreed to allow missionaries to visit their villages. The French Jesuit missionaries were known as the "black-robes" to the Haudenosaunee, who began to urge that Catholic converts should relocate to the Caughnawaga, Kanienkeh outside of Montreal. This treaty lasted for 17 years.

=== 1670–1701 ===
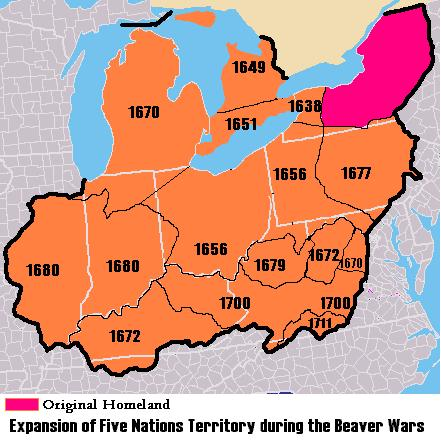
Haudenosaunee conquests 1638–1711

Around 1670, the Haudenosaunee drove the Manahoac out of the northern Virginia Piedmont region, and began to claim ownership of the territory. In 1672, they were defeated by a war party of Susquehannock, and the Haudenosaunee appealed to the French Governor Frontenac for support:

It would be a shame for him to allow his children to be crushed, as they saw themselves to be ... they not having the means of going to attack their fort, which was very strong, nor even of defending themselves if the others came to attack them in their villages.

Some old histories state that the Haudenosaunee defeated the Susquehannock but this is undocumented and doubtful. In 1677, the Haudenosaunee adopted the majority of the Iroquoian-speaking Susquehannock into their nation.

In January 1676, the Governor of the New York colony, Edmund Andros, sent a letter to the chiefs of the Haudenosaunee asking for their help in King Philip's War, as the English colonists in New England were having much difficulty fighting the Wampanoag led by Metacom. In exchange for precious guns from the English, a Haudenosaunee war party devastated the Wampanoag in February 1676, destroying villages and food stores while taking many prisoners.

By 1677, the Haudenosaunee allied with the English through an agreement known as the Covenant Chain. By 1680, the Haudenosaunee Confederacy was in a strong position, having eliminated the Susquehannock and the Wampanoag, taken vast numbers of captives to augment their population, and secured an alliance with the English supplying guns and ammunition. The Haudenosaunee colonized the northern shore of Lake Ontario and sent raiding parties westward all the way to Illinois Country. The tribes of Illinois were eventually defeated, not by the Haudenosaunee, but by the Potawatomi.

In 1679, the Susquehannock, with Haudenosaunee help, attacked Maryland's Piscataway and Mattawoman allies. Peace was not reached until 1685. During the same period, French Jesuit missionaries were active in Iroquoia, which led to a voluntary mass relocation of many Haudenosaunee to the St. Lawrence valley at Kahnawake and Kanesatake near Montreal. The French intended to use the Catholic Haudenosaunee in the St. Lawrence valley as a buffer to keep the English-allied Haudenosaunee tribes, in what is now upstate New York, away from the center of the French fur trade in Montreal. The attempts of both the English and the French to make use of their Haudenosaunee allies were foiled, as the two groups of Haudenosaunee showed a "profound reluctance to kill one another". Following the move of the Catholic Haudenosaunee to the St. Lawrence valley, historians commonly describe the Haudenosaunee living outside of Montreal as the Canadian Haudenosaunee, while those remaining in their historical heartland in modern upstate New York are described as the League Haudenosaunee.

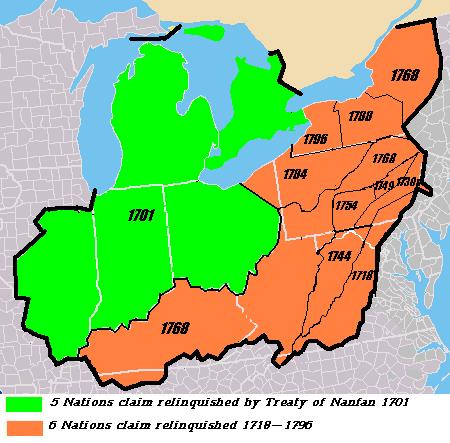
Map showing dates Haudenosaunee claims relinquished, 1701–1796. Note: In the 1701 Nanfan Treaty, the Five Nations abandoned their nominal claims to "beaver hunting" lands north of the Ohio in favor of England; however, these areas were still de facto controlled by other tribes allied with France.

In 1684, the Governor General of New France, Joseph-Antoine Le Febvre de La Barre, decided to launch a punitive expedition against the Seneca, who were attacking French and Algonquian fur traders in the Mississippi river valley, and asked for the Catholic Haudenosaunee to contribute fighting men. La Barre's expedition ended in fiasco in September 1684 when influenza broke out among the French troupes de la Marine while the Canadian Haudenosaunee warriors refused to fight, instead only engaging in battles of insults with the Seneca warriors. King Louis XIV of France was not amused when he heard of La Barre's failure, which led to his replacement with Jacques-René de Brisay, Marquis de Denonville (Governor General 1685–1689), who arrived in August with orders from the Sun King to crush the Haudenosaunee confederacy and uphold the honor of France even in the wilds of North America. In the same year, the Haudenosaunee again invaded Virginia and Illinois territory and unsuccessfully attacked French outposts in the latter. Trying to reduce warfare in the Shenandoah Valley of Virginia, later that year the Virginia Colony agreed in a conference at Albany to recognize the Haudenosaunee's right to use the north–south path, known as the Great Warpath, running east of the Blue Ridge, provided they did not intrude on the English settlements east of the Fall Line.

In 1687, the Marquis de Denonville set out for Fort Frontenac (modern Kingston, Ontario) with a well-organized force. In July 1687, Denonville took with him on his expedition a mixed force of troupes de la Marine, French-Canadian militiamen, and 353 Indian warriors from the Jesuit mission settlements, including 220 Haudenosaunee. They met under a flag of truce with 50 Royaner from the Onondaga council fire, on the north shore of Lake Ontario in what is now southern Ontario. Denonville recaptured the fort for New France and seized, chained, and shipped the 50 Haudenosaunee chiefs to Marseille, France, to be used as galley slaves. Several of the Catholic Haudenosaunee were outraged at this treachery to a diplomatic party, which led to at least 100 of them to desert to the Seneca. Denonville justified enslaving the people he encountered, saying that as a "civilized European" he did not respect the customs of "savages" and would do as he liked with them. On August 13, 1687, an advance party of French soldiers walked into a Seneca ambush and were nearly killed to a man; however the Seneca fled when the main French force came up. The remaining Catholic Haudenosaunee warriors refused to pursue the retreating Seneca.

Denonville ravaged the land of the Seneca, landing a French armada at Irondequoit Bay, striking straight into the seat of Seneca power, and destroying many of its villages. Fleeing before the attack, the Seneca moved farther west, east and south down the Susquehanna River. Although great damage was done to their homeland, the Senecas' military might was not appreciably weakened. The Confederacy and the Seneca developed an alliance with the English who were settling in the east. The destruction of the Seneca land infuriated the members of the Haudenosaunee Confederacy. On August 4, 1689, they retaliated by burning down Lachine, a small town adjacent to Montreal. Fifteen hundred Haudenosaunee warriors had been harassing Montreal defenses for many months prior to that.

They finally exhausted and defeated Denonville and his forces. His tenure was followed by the return of Frontenac for the next nine years (1689–1698). Frontenac had arranged a new strategy to weaken the Haudenosaunee. As an act of conciliation, he located the 13 surviving Royaner of the 50 originally taken and returned with them to New France in October 1689. In 1690, Frontenac destroyed Schenectady, Kanienkeh, and in 1693 burned down three other Mohawk villages and took 300 prisoners.

In 1696, Frontenac decided to take the field against the Haudenosaunee, despite being seventy-six years old. He decided to target the Oneida and Onondaga, instead of the Mohawk who had been the favorite enemies of the French. On July 6, he left Lachine at the head of a considerable force and traveled to the capital of Onondaga, where he arrived a month later. With support from the French, the Algonquian nations drove the Haudenosaunee out of the territories north of Lake Erie and west of present-day Cleveland, Ohio, regions which they had conquered during the Beaver Wars. In the meantime, the Haudenosaunee had abandoned their villages. As pursuit was impracticable, the French army commenced its return march on August 10. Under Frontenac's leadership, the Canadian militia became increasingly adept at guerrilla warfare, taking the war into Haudenosaunee territory and attacking a number of English settlements. The Haudenosaunee never threatened the French colony again.

During King William's War (North American part of the War of the Grand Alliance), the Haudenosaunee were allied with the English. In July 1701, they concluded the "Nanfan Treaty", deeding the English a large tract north of the Ohio River. The Haudenosaunee claimed to have conquered this territory 80 years earlier. France did not recognize the treaty, as it had settlements in the territory at that time and the English had virtually none. Meanwhile, the Haudenosaunee were negotiating peace with the French; together they signed the Great Peace of Montreal that same year.

=== War in 17th century culture ===
For the Haudenosaunee, grief for a loved one who died was a powerful emotion. They believed that if it was not attended to, it would cause all sorts of problems for the grieving who would go mad if left without consolation. Rituals to honor the dead were very important and the most important of all was the condolence ceremony to provide consolation for those who lost a family member or friend. Since it was believed that the death of a family member also weakened the spiritual strength of the surviving family members, it was considered crucially important to replace the lost family member by providing a substitute who could be adopted, or alternatively could be tortured to provide an outlet for the grief. Hence the "mourning wars".

One of the central features of traditional Haudenosaunee life were the "mourning wars", when their warriors would raid neighboring peoples in search of captives to replace those Haudenosaunee who had died. War for the Haudenosaunee was primarily undertaken for captives. They were not concerned with such goals as expansion of territory or glory in battle, as were the Europeans. They did, however, go to war to control hunting grounds, especially as the fur trade became more lucrative.

A war party was considered successful if it took many prisoners without suffering losses in return; killing enemies was considered acceptable if necessary, but disapproved of as it reduced the number of potential captives. Taking captives were considered far more important than scalps. Additionally, war served as a way for young men to demonstrate their valor and courage. This was a prerequisite for a man to be made a chief, and it was also essential for men who wanted to marry. Haudenosaunee women admired warriors who were brave in war. In the pre-contact era, war was relatively bloodless, as First Nations peoples did not have guns and fought one another in suits of wooden armor. In 1609, the French explorer Samuel de Champlain observed several battles between the Algonquin and the Haudenosaunee that resulted in hardly any deaths. This seemed to be the norm for First Nations wars. At a battle between the Algonquin and the Haudenosaunee by the shores of Lake Champlain, the only people killed were two Haudenosaunee warriors hit by bullets from Champlain's musket, in a demonstration to his Algonquin allies.

The clan mothers would demand a "mourning war" to provide consolation and renewed spiritual strength for a family that lost a member to death. Either the warriors would go on a "mourning war" or would be marked by the clan mothers as cowards forever, which made them unmarriageable. At this point, the war chief would hold a council, sing the war song, and lead a raid on a neighboring people in search of captives. The captives were either adopted into Haudenosaunee families to become assimilated, or were to be killed after bouts of ritualized torture as a way of expressing rage at the death of a family member. The male captives were usually received with blows, passing through a kind of gauntlet as they were brought into the community. All captives, regardless of their sex or age, were stripped naked and tied to poles in the middle of the community. After having sensitive parts of their bodies burned and some of their fingernails pulled out, the prisoners were allowed to rest and given food and water. In the following days, the captives had to dance naked before the community, when individual families decided for each if the person was to be adopted or killed. Women and children were more often adopted than were older men. If those who were adopted into the Haudenosaunee families made a sincere effort to become Haudenosaunee, then they would be embraced by the community, and if they did not, then they were swiftly executed.

Those slated for execution had to wear red and black facial paint and were "adopted" by a family who addressed the prisoner as "uncle", "aunt", "nephew" or "niece" depending on their age and sex, and would bring them food and water. The captive would be executed after a day-long torture session of burning and removing body parts, which the prisoner was expected to bear with stoicism and nobility (an expectation not usually met) before being scalped alive. Hot sand was applied to the exposed skull and they were finally killed by cutting out their hearts. Afterward, the victim's body was cut and eaten by the community. The practice of ritual torture and execution, together with cannibalism, ended some time in the early 18th century. By the late-18th-century, European writers such as Filippo Mazzei and James Adair were denying that the Haudenosaunee engaged in ritual torture and cannibalism, saying they had seen no evidence of such practices during their visits to Haudenosaunee villages.

In 1711, Onondaga chief Teganissorens told Sir Robert Hunter, governor of New York: "We are not like you Christians, for when you have prisoners of one another you send them home, by such means you can never rout one another". The converse of this strategy was that the Haudenosaunee would not accept losses in battle, as it defeated the whole purpose of the "mourning wars", which was to add to their numbers, not decrease them. The French during their wars with the Haudenosaunee were often astonished when a war party that was on the verge of victory over them could be made to retreat by killing one or two of their number. The European notion of a glorious death in battle had no counterpart with the Haudenosaunee.

Death in battle was accepted only when absolutely necessary, and the Haudenosaunee believed the souls of those who died in battle were destined to spend eternity as angry ghosts haunting the world in search of vengeance. For this reason, those who died in battle were never buried in community cemeteries, as it would bring the presence of unhappy ghosts into the community.

The Haudenosaunee engaged in tactics that the French, the British, and the Americans all considered to be cowardly, until the Americans adopted similar guerrilla tactics. The Haudenosaunee preferred ambushes and surprise attacks, would almost never attack a fortified place or attack frontally, and would retreat if outnumbered. If Kanienkeh was invaded, the Haudenosaunee would attempt to ambush the enemy, or alternatively they would retreat behind the wooden walls of their villages to endure a siege. If the enemy appeared too powerful, as when the French invaded Kanienkeh in 1693, the Haudenosaunee burned their villages and their crops, and the entire population retreated into the woods to wait for the French to depart. The main weapons for the Haudenosaunee were bows and arrows with flint tips and quivers made from corn husks. Shields and war clubs were made from wood. After contact was established with Europeans, the Native Americans adopted such tools as metal knives and hatchets, and made their tomahawks with iron or steel blades. It has been posited that the tomahawk was not used extensively in battle, but instead became associated with the Haudenosaunee through European depictions that sought to portray natives as savage and threatening. Before taking to the field, war chiefs would lead ritual purification ceremonies in which the warriors would dance around a pole painted red.

European infectious diseases such as smallpox devastated the Five Nations in the 17th century, causing thousands of deaths, as they had no acquired immunity to the new diseases, which had been endemic among Europeans for centuries. The League began a period of "mourning wars" without precedent; compounding deaths from disease, they nearly annihilated the Huron, Petun and Neutral peoples. By the 1640s, it is estimated that smallpox had reduced the population of the Haudenosaunee by least 50%. Massive "mourning wars" were undertaken to make up these losses. The American historian Daniel Richter wrote it was at this point that war changed from being sporadic, small-scale raids launched in response to individual deaths, and became "the constant and increasing undifferentiated symptom of societies in demographic crisis". The introduction of guns, which could pierce the wooden armor, made First Nations warfare bloodier and more deadly than it had been in the pre-contact era. This ended the age when armed conflicts were more brawls than battles as Europeans would have understood the term. At the same time, guns could only be obtained by trading furs with the Europeans. Once the Haudenosaunee exhausted their supplies of beaver by about 1640, they were forced to buy beaver pelts from Indians living further north, which led them to attempt to eliminate other middlemen to monopolize the fur trade in a series of "beaver wars". Richter wrote

the mourning war tradition, deaths from disease, dependence on firearms, and the trade in furs combined to produce a dangerous spiral: epidemics led to deadlier mourning wars fought with firearms; the need for guns increased the need for pelts to trade for them; the quest for furs provoked wars with other nations; and deaths in those wars began the mourning war cycle anew.

From 1640 to 1701, the Five Nations was almost continuously at war, battling at various times the French, Huron, Erie, Neutral, Lenape, Susquenhannock, Petun, Abenaki, Ojibwa, and Algonquin peoples, fighting campaigns from Virginia to the Mississippi and all the way to what is now northern Ontario.

Despite taking thousands of captives, the Five Nations populations continued to fall, as diseases continued to take their toll. French Jesuits, whom the Haudenosaunee were forced to accept after making peace with the French in 1667, encouraged Catholic converts to move to mission villages in the St. Lawrence river valley near Montreal and Quebec. In the 1640s, the Mohawk could field about 800 warriors. By the 1670s, they could field only 300 warriors, indicating population decline.

== 18th and 19th centuries ==
=== French and Indian Wars ===
After the 1701 peace treaty with the French, the Haudenosaunee remained mostly neutral. During the course of the 17th century, the Haudenosaunee had acquired a fearsome reputation among the Europeans, and it was the policy of the Six Nations to use this reputation to play off the French against the British to extract the maximum amount of material rewards. In 1689, the English Crown provided the Six Nations goods worth £100 in exchange for help against the French; in 1693 the Haudenosaunee had received goods worth £600, and in 1701 the Six Nations had received goods worth £800.

During Queen Anne's War (the North American part of the War of the Spanish Succession), they were involved in planned attacks against the French. Pieter Schuyler, mayor of Albany, arranged for three Mohawk chiefs and a Mahican chief (known incorrectly as the Four Mohawk Kings) to travel to London in 1710 to meet with Queen Anne, in an effort to seal an alliance with the British. Queen Anne was so impressed by her visitors that she commissioned their portraits by court painter John Verelst. The paintings are believed to be the earliest surviving oil portraits of Aboriginal peoples taken from life.

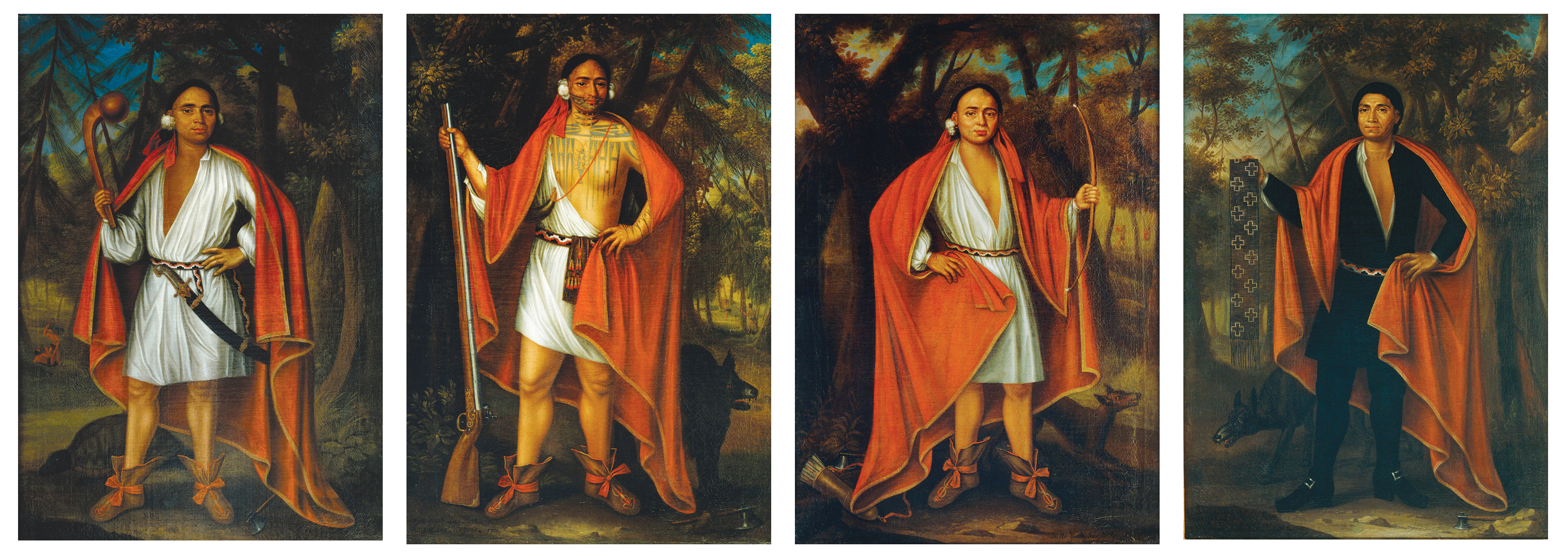
Paintings of the Mahican and three "Mohawk Kings" who travelled to London in 1710, by John Verelst

In the early 18th century, the Tuscarora gradually migrated northward toward Pennsylvania and New York after a bloody conflict with white settlers in North and South Carolina. Due to shared linguistic and cultural similarities, the Tuscarora gradually aligned with the Haudenosaunee and entered the confederacy as the sixth Indian nation in 1722, after being sponsored by the Oneida.

The Haudenosaunee program toward the defeated tribes favored assimilation within the 'Covenant Chain' and Great Law of Peace, over wholesale slaughter. Both the Lenni Lenape, and the Shawnee were briefly tributary to the Six Nations, while subjected Iroquoian populations emerged in the next period as the Mingo, speaking a dialect like that of the Seneca, in the Ohio region. During the War of Spanish Succession, known to Americans as "Queen Anne's War", the Haudenosaunee remained neutral, through leaning towards the British. Anglican missionaries were active with the Haudenosaunee and devised a system of writing for them.

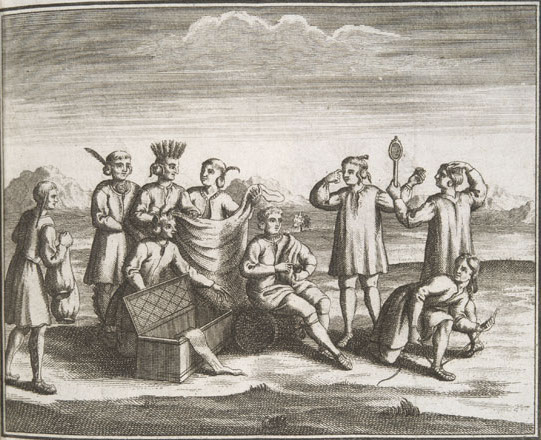
Engraving of Haudenosaunee people engaging in trade with Europeans, 1722

In 1721 and 1722, Lieutenant Governor Alexander Spotswood of Virginia concluded a new Treaty at Albany with the Haudenosaunee, renewing the Covenant Chain and agreeing to recognize the Blue Ridge as the demarcation between the Virginia Colony and the Haudenosaunee. But, as European settlers began to move beyond the Blue Ridge and into the Shenandoah Valley in the 1730s, the Haudenosaunee objected. Virginia officials told them that the demarcation was to prevent the Haudenosaunee from trespassing east of the Blue Ridge, but it did not prevent English from expanding west. Tensions increased over the next decades, and the Haudenosaunee were on the verge of going to war with the Virginia Colony. In 1743, Governor Sir William Gooch paid them the sum of 100 pounds sterling for any settled land in the Valley that was claimed by the Haudenosaunee. The following year at the Treaty of Lancaster, the Haudenosaunee sold Virginia all their remaining claims in the Shenandoah Valley for 200 pounds in gold.

During the French and Indian War (the North American theater of the Seven Years' War), the League Haudenosaunee sided with the British against the French and their Algonquian allies, who were traditional enemies. The Haudenosaunee hoped that aiding the British would also bring favors after the war. Few Haudenosaunee warriors joined the campaign. By contrast, the Canadian Haudenosaunee supported the French.

In 1711, refugees from what is now southwestern Germany known as the Palatines appealed to the Haudenosaunee clan mothers for permission to settle on their land. By spring of 1713, about 150 Palatine families had leased land from the Haudenosaunee. The Haudenosaunee taught the Palatines how to grow "the Three Sisters" as they called their staple crops of beans, corn and squash, and where to find edible nuts, roots and berries. In return, the Palatines taught the Haudenosaunee how to grow wheat and oats, and how to use iron ploughs and hoes to farm. As a result of the money earned from land rented to the Palatines, the Haudenosaunee elite gave up living in longhouses and started living in European style houses, having an income equal to a middle-class English family. By the middle of the 18th century, a multi-cultural world had emerged with the Haudenosaunee living alongside German and Scots-Irish settlers. The settlements of the Palatines were intermixed with the Haudenosaunee villages. In 1738, an Irishman, Sir William Johnson, who was successful as a fur trader, settled with the Haudenosaunee. Johnson, who became very rich from the fur trade and land speculation, learned the languages of the Haudenosaunee, and became the main intermediary between the British and the League. In 1745, Johnson was appointed the Northern superintendent of Indian Affairs, formalizing his position.

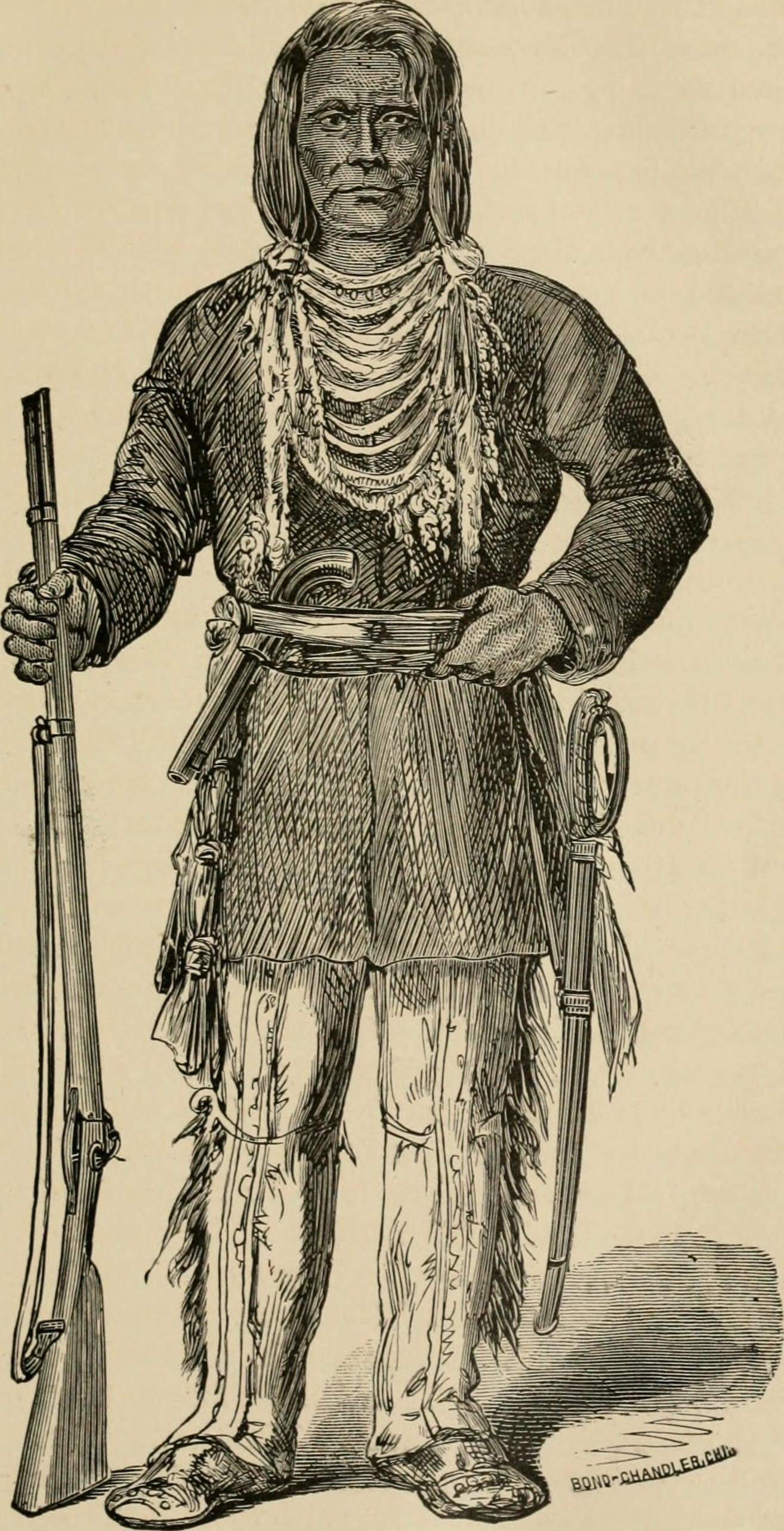
Unnamed Haudenosaunee chief, early 18th century

On July 9, 1755, a force of British Army regulars and the Virginia militia under General Edward Braddock, advancing into the Ohio river valley, was almost completely destroyed by the French and their Indian allies at the Battle of the Monongahela. Johnson, who had the task of enlisting the League Haudenosaunee on the British side, led a mixed Anglo-Haudenosaunee force to victory at Lac du St Sacrement, known to the British as Lake George. In the Battle of Lake George, a group of Catholic Mohawk (from Kahnawake) and French forces ambushed a Mohawk-led British column; the Mohawk were deeply disturbed, as they had created their confederacy for peace among the peoples and had not had warfare against each other. Johnson attempted to ambush a force of 1,000 French troops and 700 Canadian Haudenosaunee under the command of Baron Dieskau, who beat off the attack and killed the old Mohawk war chief, Peter Hendricks. On September 8, 1755, Diskau attacked Johnson's camp, but was repulsed with heavy losses. Though the Battle of Lake George was a British victory, the heavy losses taken by the Mohawk and Oneida at the battle caused the League to declare neutrality in the war. Despite Johnson's best efforts, the League Haudenosaunee remained neutral for the next several years, and a series of French victories at Oswego, Louisbourg, Fort William Henry and Fort Carillon ensured the League Haudenosaunee would not fight on what appeared to be the losing side.

In February 1756, the French learned from a spy, Oratory, an Oneida chief, that the British were stockpiling supplies at the Oneida Carrying Place, a crucial portage between Albany and Oswego, to support an offensive in the spring into what is now Ontario. As the frozen waters south of Lake Ontario melted on average two weeks before the waters north of the lake, the British would be able to move against the French bases at Fort Frontenac and Fort Niagara before the French forces in Montreal could come to their relief―which from the French perspective necessitated a pre-emptive strike at the Oneida Carrying Place in the winter. To carry out this strike, the Marquis de Vaudreuil, the Governor-General of New France, assigned the task to Gaspard-Joseph Chaussegros de Léry, an officer of the troupes de le Marine, who required and received the assistance of the Canadian Haudenosaunee to guide him to the Oneida Carrying Place. The Canadian Haudenosaunee joined the expedition, which left Montreal on February 29, 1756, on the understanding that they would only fight against the British, not the League Haudenosaunee, and they would not be assaulting a fort.

On March 13, 1756, an Oswegatchie Indian traveler informed the expedition that the British had built two forts at the Oneida Carrying Place, causing the majority of the Canadian Haudenosaunee to want to turn back, as they argued the risks of assaulting a fort would mean too many casualties, and many did in fact abandon the expedition. On March 26, 1756, Léry's force of troupes de le Marine and French-Canadian militiamen, who had not eaten for two days, received much needed food when the Canadian Haudenosaunee ambushed a British wagon train bringing supplies to Fort William and Fort Bull. As far as the Canadian Haudenosaunee were concerned, the raid was a success, as they captured 9 wagons full of supplies and took 10 prisoners without losing a man; and for them, engaging in a frontal attack against the two wooden forts as Léry wanted to do was irrational. The Canadian Haudenosaunee informed Léry "if I absolutely wanted to die, I was the master of the French, but they were not going to follow me". In the end, about 30 Canadian Haudenosaunee reluctantly joined Léry's attack on Fort Bull on the morning of March 27, 1756, when the French and their Indian allies stormed the fort, finally smashing their way in through the main gate with a battering ram at noon. Of the 63 people in Fort Bull, half of whom were civilians, only 3 soldiers, one carpenter and one woman survived the Battle of Fort Bull, as Léry reported "I could not restrain the ardor of the soldiers and the Canadians. They killed everyone they encountered". Afterward, the French destroyed all of the British supplies and Fort Bull itself, securing the western flank of New France. On the same day, the main force of the Canadian Haudenosaunee ambushed a relief force from Fort William coming to the aid of Fort Bull, and did not slaughter their prisoners as the French did at Fort Bull; for the Haudenosaunee, prisoners were very valuable as they increased the size of the tribe.

The crucial difference between the European and First Nations way of war was that Europe had millions of people, which meant that British and French generals were willing to see thousands of their own men die in battle to secure victory, as their losses could always be made good; by contrast, the Haudenosaunee had a considerably smaller population, and could not afford heavy losses, which could cripple a community. The Haudenosaunee custom of "Mourning wars" to take captives who would become Haudenosaunee reflected the continual need for more people in the Haudenosaunee communities. Haudenosaunee warriors were brave, but would only fight to the death if necessary, usually to protect their women and children; otherwise, the crucial concern for Haudenosaunee chiefs was always to save manpower. The Canadian historian D. Peter MacLeod wrote that the Haudenosaunee way of war was based on their hunting philosophy, where a successful hunter would bring down an animal efficiently without taking any losses to his hunting party, and in the same way, a successful war leader would inflict losses on the enemy without taking any losses in return.

The Haudenosaunee only entered the war on the British side again in late 1758, after the British took Louisbourg and Fort Frontenac. At the Treaty of Fort Easton in October 1758, the Haudenosaunee forced the Lenape and Shawnee who had been fighting for the French to declare neutrality. In July 1759, the Haudenosaunee helped Johnson take Fort Niagara. In the ensuing campaign, the League Haudenosaunee assisted General Jeffrey Amherst, as he took various French forts by the Great Lakes and the St. Lawrence valley while advancing toward Montreal, which he took in September 1760. The British historian Michael Johnson wrote the Haudenosaunee had "played a major supporting role" in the final British victory in the Seven Years' War. In 1763, Johnson left his old home of Fort Johnson for the lavish estate he called Johnson Hall, which became a center of social life in the region. Johnson was close to two white families, the Butlers and the Croghans, and three Mohawk families, the Brants, the Hills, and the Peters.

After the war, to protect their alliance, the British government issued the Royal Proclamation of 1763, forbidding white settlement beyond the Appalachian Mountains. American colonists largely ignored the order, and the British had insufficient soldiers to enforce it.

Faced with confrontations, the Haudenosaunee agreed to adjust the line again in the Treaty of Fort Stanwix (1768). Sir William Johnson, 1st Baronet, British Superintendent of Indian Affairs for the Northern District, had called the Haudenosaunee nations together in a grand conference in western New York, which a total of 3,102 Indians attended. They had long had good relations with Johnson, who had traded with them and learned their languages and customs. As Alan Taylor noted in his history, The Divided Ground: Indians, Settlers, and the Northern Borderland of the American Revolution (2006), the Haudenosaunee were creative and strategic thinkers. They chose to sell to the British Crown all their remaining claim to the lands between the Ohio and Tennessee rivers, which they did not occupy, hoping by doing so to draw off English pressure on their territories in the province of New York.

=== American Revolution ===
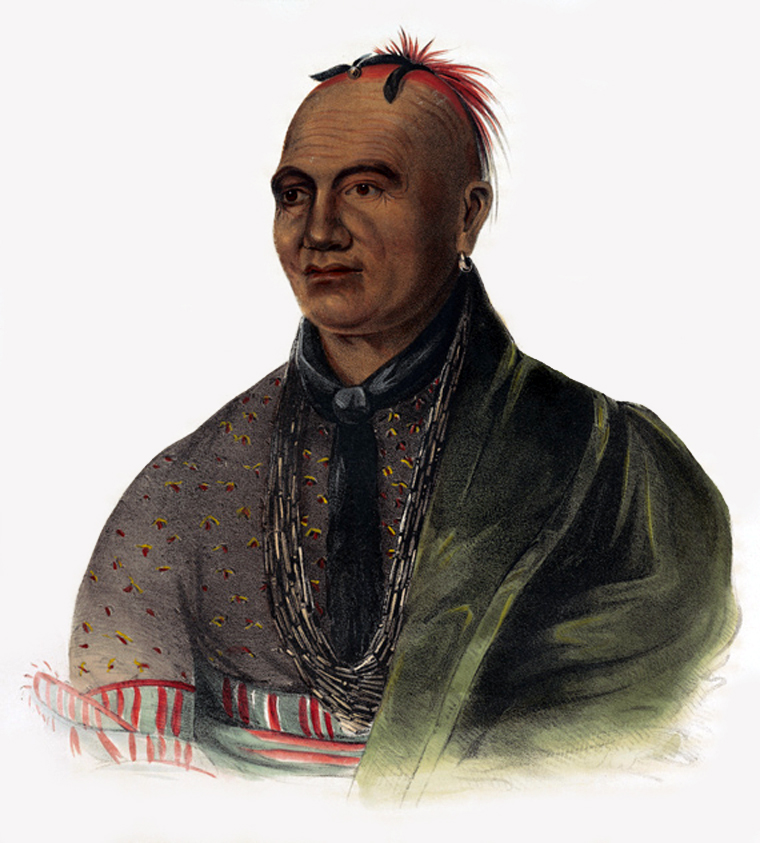
Lithograph of the Mohawk war and political leader Thayendanegea (also Joseph Brant)

During the American Revolution, the Haudenosaunee first tried to stay neutral. The Reverend Samuel Kirkland, a Congregational minister working as a missionary, pressured the Oneida and the Tuscarora for a pro-American neutrality, while Guy Johnson and his cousin John Johnson pressured the Mohawk, the Cayuga and the Seneca to fight for the British. Pressed to join one side or the other, the Tuscarora and the Oneida sided with the colonists, while the Mohawk, Seneca, Onondaga, and Cayuga remained loyal to Great Britain, with whom they had stronger relationships. Joseph Louis Cook offered his services to the United States and received a Congressional commission as a lieutenant colonel—the highest rank held by any Native American during the war. The Mohawk war chief Joseph Brant together with John Butler and John Johnson raised racially mixed forces of irregulars to fight for the Crown. Molly Brant had been the common-law wife of Sir William Johnson, and it was through her patronage that her brother Joseph came to be a war chief.

The Mohawk war chief Joseph Brant, other war chiefs, and British allies conducted numerous operations against frontier settlements in the Mohawk Valley, including the Cherry Valley massacre, destroying many villages and crops, and killing and capturing inhabitants. The destructive raids by Brant and other Loyalists led to appeals to Congress for help. The Continentals retaliated and in 1779, George Washington ordered the Sullivan Campaign, led by Col. Daniel Brodhead and General John Sullivan, against the Haudenosaunee nations to "not merely overrun, but destroy", the British-Indian alliance. They burned many Haudenosaunee villages and stores throughout western New York; refugees moved north to Canada. By the end of the war, few houses or barns in the valley had survived the warfare. In the aftermath of the Sullivan expedition, Brant visited Quebec City to ask General Sir Frederick Haildmand for assurances that the Mohawk and the other Loyalist Haudenosaunee would receive a new homeland in Canada as compensation for their loyalty to the Crown if the British should lose.

The American Revolution caused a great divide among the colonists, between Patriots and Loyalists, and a large proportion (30–35%) who were neutral; it caused a divide between the colonies and Great Britain, and it also caused a rift that would break the Haudenosaunee Confederacy. At the onset of the Revolution, the Haudenosaunee Confederacy's Six Nations attempted to take a stance of neutrality. However, almost inevitably, the Haudenosaunee nations eventually had to take sides in the conflict. Thus it is clear how the American Revolution would have caused conflict and confusion among the Six Nations. For years they had been used to thinking about the English and their colonists as one and the same people. With the American Revolution, the Haudenosaunee Confederacy now had to deal with relationships between two governments.

The Haudenosaunee Confederation's population had changed significantly since the arrival of Europeans. Disease had reduced their population to a fraction of what it had been in the past. Therefore, it was in their best interest to be on the good side of whoever would prove to be the winning side in the war, for the winning side would dictate how future relationships would be with the Haudenosaunee in North America. Dealing with two governments made it hard to maintain a neutral stance, because the governments might grow envious if the Confederacy were interacting or trading more with one side over the other, or even if there were merely the perception of favoritism. Because of this challenging situation, the Six Nations had to choose sides. The Oneida and Tuscarora decided to support the American colonists, while the rest of the Haudenosaunee League (the Cayuga, Mohawk, Onondaga, and Seneca) sided with the British and their Loyalists among the colonists.

There were many reasons that the Six Nations could not remain neutral and uninvolved in the Revolutionary War. One of these is simple proximity; the Haudenosaunee Confederacy was too close to the action of the war not to be involved. The Six Nations were very discontented with the encroachment of the English and their colonists upon their land. They were particularly concerned with the border established in the Proclamation of 1763 and the Treaty of Fort Stanwix in 1768.

During the American Revolution, the authority of the British government over the frontier was hotly contested. The colonists tried to take advantage of this as much as possible by seeking their own profit and claiming new land. In 1775, the Six Nations were still neutral when "a Mohawk person was killed by a Continental soldier". Such a case shows how the Six Nations' proximity to the war drew them into it. They were concerned about being killed, and about their lands being taken from them. They could not show weakness and simply let the colonists and British do whatever they wanted. Many of the English and colonists did not respect the treaties made in the past. "A number of His Majesty's subjects in the American colonies viewed the proclamation as a temporary prohibition which would soon give way to the opening of the area for settlement ... and that it was simply an agreement to quiet the minds of the Indians". The Six Nations had to take a stand to show that they would not accept such treatment, and they looked to build a relationship with a government that would respect their territory.

In addition to being in close proximity to the war, the new lifestyle and economics of the Haudenosaunee Confederacy since the arrival of Europeans in North America had made it nearly impossible for the Haudenosaunee to isolate themselves from the conflict. By this time, the Haudenosaunee had become dependent upon the trade of goods from the English and other colonists, and had adopted many European customs, tools, and weapons. For example, they were increasingly dependent on firearms for hunting. After becoming so reliant, it would have been difficult even to consider cutting off a trade that had brought the goods so central to everyday life.

As Barbara Graymont stated, "Their task was an impossible one to maintain neutrality. Their economies and lives had become so dependent on each other for trading goods and benefits it was impossible to ignore the conflict. Meanwhile, they had to try and balance their interactions with both groups. They did not want to seem as they were favoring one group over the other, because of sparking jealousy and suspicion from either side". Furthermore, the British Crown had made many agreements with the Six Nations over the years, yet most of the Haudenosaunee's day-to-day interaction had been with the colonists. This made for a confusing situation for the Haudenosaunee, because they could not tell who the true heirs of the agreement were, nor could they know if agreements with Britain would continue to be honored by the colonists if they were to win independence.

Supporting either side in the Revolutionary War was a complicated decision. Each nation individually weighed its options to come up with a final stance that ultimately broke neutrality and ended the collective agreement of the Confederation. The British were clearly the most organized, and seemingly most powerful. In many cases, the British presented the situation to the Haudenosaunee as the colonists just being "naughty children". On the other hand, the Haudenosaunee considered that "the British government was three thousand miles away. This placed them at a disadvantage in attempting to enforce both the Proclamation of 1763 and the Treaty at Fort Stanwix 1768 against land hungry frontiersmen." In other words, even though the British were the strongest and best organized faction, the Six Nations had concerns about whether they would truly be able to enforce their agreements from such a distance.

The Haudenosaunee also had concerns about the colonists. The British asked for Haudenosaunee support in the war. "In 1775, the Continental Congress sent a delegation to the Iroquois in Albany to ask for their neutrality in the war coming against the British". It had been clear already that the colonists had not been respectful of the land agreements made in 1763 and 1768. The Haudenosaunee Confederacy was particularly concerned over the possibility of the colonists winning the war, for if a revolutionary victory were to occur, the Haudenosaunee very much saw it as the precursor to their lands being taken away by the victorious colonists, who would no longer have the British Crown to restrain them. Continental army officers such as George Washington had attempted to destroy the Haudenosaunee.

However it was the colonists who had formed the most direct relationships with the Haudenosaunee, due to their proximity and trade ties. For the most part, the colonists and Haudenosaunee had lived in relative peace since the English arrival on the continent a century and a half before. The Haudenosaunee had to determine whether their relationships with the colonists were reliable, or whether the British would prove to better serve their interests. They also had to determine whether there were really any differences between how the British and the colonists would treat them.

The war ensued, and the Haudenosaunee broke their confederation. Hundreds of years of precedent and collective government were overturned by the immensity of the American Revolutionary War. The Oneida and Tuscarora decided to support the colonists, while the rest of the Haudenosaunee League (the Cayuga, Mohawk, Onondaga, and Seneca) sided with the British and Loyalists. At the conclusion of the war the fear that the colonists would not respect the Haudenosaunee's pleas came true, especially after the majority of the Six Nations decided to side with the British and were no longer considered trustworthy by the newly independent Americans. In 1783 the Treaty of Paris was signed. While the treaty included peace agreements between all of the European nations involved in the war as well as the newborn United States, it made no provisions for the Haudenosaunee, who were left to be treatied with by the new U.S. government as it saw fit.

=== Post-war ===
After the Revolutionary War, the ancient central fireplace of the League was re-established at Buffalo Creek. The U.S. and the Haudenosaunee signed the Treaty of Fort Stanwix in 1784, whereby the Haudenosaunee ceded much of their historical homeland to the Americans, followed by another treaty in 1794 at Canandaigua where they ceded even more land to the Americans. The governor of New York state, George Clinton, was constantly pressuring the Haudenosaunee to sell their land to white settlers, and as alcoholism became a major problem in the Haudenosaunee communities, many did sell their land to buy more alcohol, usually to unscrupulous agents of land companies. At the same time, American settlers continued to push into the lands beyond the Ohio river, leading to a war between the Western Confederacy and the U.S. One of the Haudenosaunee chiefs, Cornplanter, persuaded the Haudenosaunee in New York state to remain neutral and not to join the Western Confederacy. At the same time, American policies to make the Haudenosaunee more settled were starting to have some effect. Traditionally for the Haudenosaunee, farming was woman's work and hunting was men's work; by the early 19th century, American policies to have the men farm the land and cease hunting were having effect. During this time, the Haudenosaunee living in New York state become demoralized, as more of their land was sold to land speculators while alcoholism, violence, and broken families became major problems on their reservations. The Oneida and the Cayuga sold almost all of their land and moved out of their traditional homelands.

By 1811, Methodist and Episcopalian missionaries established missions to assist the Oneida and Onondaga in western New York. However, white settlers continued to move into the area. By 1821, a group of Oneida led by Eleazer Williams, son of a Mohawk woman, went to Wisconsin to buy land from the Menominee and Ho-Chunk, and thus move their people farther westward. In 1838, the Holland Land Company used forged documents to cheat the Seneca of almost all of their land in western New York, but a Quaker missionary, Asher Wright, launched lawsuits that led to one of the Seneca reservations being returned in 1842 and another in 1857. However, as late as the 1950s, both the U.S. and New York governments confiscated land belonging to the Six Nations for roads, dams and reservoirs, with the land given to Cornplanter for keeping the Haudenosaunee from joining the Western Confederacy in the 1790s being forcibly purchased by eminent domain and flooded for the Kinzua Dam.

Captain Joseph Brant and a group of Haudenosaunee left New York to settle in the Province of Quebec (present-day Ontario). To partially replace the lands they had lost in the Mohawk Valley and elsewhere because of their fateful alliance with the British Crown, the Haldimand Proclamation gave them a large land grant on the Grand River, at Six Nations of the Grand River First Nation. Brant's crossing of the river gave the original name to the area: Brant's Ford. By 1847, European settlers nearby named the village Brantford. The original Mohawk settlement was on the south edge of the present-day Canadian city, at a location still favorable for launching and landing canoes. In the 1830s, many additional Onondaga, Oneida, Seneca, Cayuga, and Tuscarora relocated into the Indian Territory, the province of Upper Canada, and Wisconsin.

=== In the west ===
Many Haudenosaunee (mostly Mohawk) and Haudenosaunee-descended Métis people living in Lower Canada (primarily at Kahnawake) took employment with the Montreal-based North West Company during its existence from 1779 to 1821 and became voyageurs or free traders working in the North American fur trade as far west as the Rocky Mountains. They are known to have settled in the area around Jasper's House and possibly as far west as the Finlay River and north as far as the Pouce Coupe and Dunvegan areas, where they founded new Aboriginal communities which have persisted to the present day claiming either First Nations or Métis identity and indigenous rights. The Michel Band, Mountain Métis, and Aseniwuche Winewak Nation of Canada in Alberta and the Kelly Lake community in British Columbia all claim Haudenosaunee ancestry.

=== Canadian Haudenosaunee ===
During the 18th century, the Catholic Canadian Haudenosaunee living outside of Montreal reestablished ties with the League Haudenosaunee. During the American Revolution, the Canadian Haudenosaunee declared their neutrality and refused to fight for the Crown, despite the offers of Sir Guy Carleton, the governor of Quebec. Many Canadian Haudenosaunee worked for both the Hudson's Bay Company and the Northwest Company as voyageurs in the fur trade in the late 18th and early 19th centuries. In the War of 1812, the Canadian Haudenosaunee again declared their neutrality. The Canadian Haudenosaunee communities at Oka and Kahnaweke were prosperous settlements in the 19th century, supporting themselves via farming and the sale of sleds, snowshoes, boats, and baskets. In 1884, about 100 Canadian Haudenosaunee were hired by the British government to serve as river pilots and boatmen for the relief expedition for the besieged General Charles Gordon in Khartoum in the Sudan, taking the force commanded by Field Marshal Wolsely up the Nile from Cairo to Khartoum. On their way back to Canada, the Canadian Haudenosaunee river pilots and boatmen stopped in London, where they were personally thanked by Queen Victoria for their services to Queen and Country. In 1886, when a bridge was being built at the St. Lawrence, a number of Haudenosaunee men from Kahnawke were hired to help in the construction, and proved so skilled as steelwork erectors that since that time, a number of bridges and skyscrapers in Canada and the U.S. have been built by Haudenosaunee steelmen.

== 20th century ==
=== World War I ===
During World War I, it was Canadian policy to encourage men from the First Nations to enlist in the Canadian Expeditionary Force (CEF), where their skills at hunting made them excellent as snipers and scouts. As the Haudenosaunee Six Nations were considered the most martial of Canada's First Nations, and, in turn, the Mohawk the most warlike of the Six Nations, the Canadian government especially encouraged the Haudenosaunee, and particularly the Mohawks, to join. About half of the 4,000 or so First Nations men who served in the CEF were Haudenosaunee. Men from the Six Nations reserve at Brantford were encouraged to join the 114th Haldimand Battalion (also known as "Brock's Rangers) of the CEF, where two entire companies including the officers were all Haudenosaunee. The 114th Battalion was formed in December 1915, and broken up in November 1916 to provide reinforcements for other battalions. A Mohawk from Brantford, William Forster Lickers, who enlisted in the CEF in September 1914, was captured at the Second Battle of Ypres in April 1915, where he was savagely beaten by his captors, as one German officer wanted to see if "Indians could feel pain". Lickers was beaten so badly that he was left paralyzed for the rest of his life, though the officer was well pleased to establish that Indians did indeed feel pain.

The Six Nations council at Brantford tended to see themselves as a sovereign nation that was allied to the Crown through the Covenant Chain going back to the 17th century, and thus allied to King George V personally, rather than under the authority of Canada. One Haudenosaunee clan mother, in a letter sent in August 1916 to a recruiting sergeant who refused to allow her teenage son to join the CEF under the grounds that he was underage, declared the Six Nations were not subject to the laws of Canada and he had no right to refuse her son, because Canadian laws did not apply to them. As she explained, the Haudenosaunee regarded the Covenant Chain as still being in effect, meaning the Haudenosaunee were only fighting in the war in response to an appeal for help from their ally, King George V, who had asked them to enlist in the CEF.

=== League of Nations ===
The complex political environment which emerged in Canada with the Haudenosaunee grew out of the Anglo-American era of European colonization. At the end of the War of 1812, Britain shifted Indian affairs from the military to civilian control. With the creation of the Canadian Confederation in 1867, civil authority, and thus Indian affairs, passed to Canadian officials with Britain retaining control of military and security matters. At the turn of the century, the Canadian government began passing a series of Acts which were strenuously objected to by the Haudenosaunee Confederacy. During World War I, an act attempted to conscript Six Nations men for military service. Under the Soldiers Resettlement Act, legislation was introduced to redistribute native land. Finally in 1920, an Act was proposed to force citizenship on "Indians" with or without their consent, which would then automatically remove their share of any tribal lands from tribal trust and make the land and the person subject to the laws of Canada.

The Haudenosaunee hired a lawyer to defend their rights in the Supreme Court of Canada. The Supreme Court refused to take the case, declaring that the members of the Six Nations were British citizens. In effect, as Canada was at the time a division of the British government, it was not an international state, as defined by international law. In contrast, the Haudenosaunee Confederacy had been making treaties and functioning as a state since 1643 and all of their treaties had been negotiated with Britain, not Canada. As a result, a decision was made in 1921 to send a delegation to petition the King George V, whereupon Canada's External Affairs division blocked issuing passports. In response, the Haudenosaunee began issuing their own passports and sent Levi General, the Cayuga Chief "Deskaheh", to England with their attorney. Winston Churchill dismissed their complaint claiming that it was within the realm of Canadian jurisdiction and referred them back to Canadian officials.

On December 4, 1922, Charles Stewart, Superintendent of Indian Affairs, and Duncan Campbell Scott, Deputy Superintendent of the Canadian Department of Indian Affairs traveled to Brantford to negotiate a settlement on the issues with the Six Nations. After the meeting, the Native delegation brought the offer to the tribal council, as was customary under Haudenosaunee law. The council agreed to accept the offer, but before they could respond, the Royal Canadian Mounted Police conducted a liquor raid on the Haudenosaunee's Grand River territory. The siege lasted three days and prompted the Haudenosaunee to send Deskaheh to Washington, D/C., to meet with the chargé d'affaires of the Netherlands asking the Dutch Queen to sponsor them for membership in the League of Nations. Under pressure from the British, the Netherlands reluctantly refused sponsorship.

Deskaheh and the tribal attorney proceeded to Geneva and attempted to gather support. "On 27 September 1923, delegates representing Estonia, Ireland, Panama and Persia signed a letter asking for communication of the Six Nations' petition to the League's assembly," but the effort was blocked. Six Nations delegates traveled to the Hague and back to Geneva attempting to gain supporters and recognition, while back in Canada, the government was drafting a mandate to replace the traditional Haudenosaunee Confederacy Council with one that would be elected under the auspices of the Canadian Indian Act. In an unpublicized signing on September 17, 1924, Prime Minister Mackenzie King and Governor-General Lord Byng of Vimy signed the Order in Council, which set elections on the Six Nations reserve for October 21. Only 26 ballots were cast.

The long-term effect of the Order was that the Canadian government had wrested control over the Haudenosaunee trust funds from the Haudenosaunee Confederation and decades of litigation would follow. In 1979, over 300 Indian chiefs visited London to oppose Patriation of the Canadian Constitution, fearing that their rights to be recognized in the Royal Proclamation of 1763 would be jeopardized. In 1981, hoping again to clarify that judicial responsibilities of treaties signed with Britain were not transferred to Canada, several Alberta Indian chiefs filed a petition with the British High Court of Justice. They lost the case but gained an invitation from the Canadian government to participate in the constitutional discussions which dealt with protection of treaty rights.

=== U.S. Indian termination policies ===
In the period between World War II and The Sixties, the U.S. government followed a policy of Indian Termination for its Native citizens. In a series of laws, attempting to mainstream tribal people into the greater society, the government strove to end the U.S. government's recognition of tribal sovereignty, eliminate trusteeship over Indian reservations, and implement state law applicability to native persons. In general, the laws were expected to create taxpaying citizens, subject to state and federal taxes as well as laws, from which Native people had previously been exempt.

On August 13, 1946, the Indian Claims Commission Act of 1946, Pub. L. No. 79-726, ch. 959, was passed. Its purpose was to settle for all time any outstanding grievances or claims the tribes might have against the U.S. for treaty breaches, unauthorized taking of land, dishonorable or unfair dealings, or inadequate compensation. Claims had to be filed within a five-year period, and most of the 370 complaints that were submitted were filed at the approach of the five-year deadline in August 1951.

On July 2, 1948, Congress enacted [Public Law 881] 62 Stat. 1224, which transferred criminal jurisdiction over offenses committed by and against "Indians" to the State of New York. It covered all reservations' lands within the state and prohibited the deprivation of hunting and fishing rights which might have been guaranteed to "any Indian tribe, band, or community, or members thereof." It further prohibited the state from requiring tribal members to obtain fish and game licenses. Within 2 years, Congress passed [Public Law 785] 64 Stat. 845, on September 13, 1950 which extended New York's authority to civil disputes between Indians or Indians and others within the State. It allowed the tribes to preserve customs, prohibited taxation on reservations, and reaffirmed hunting and fishing rights. It also prohibited the state from enforcing judgments regarding any land disputes or applying any State laws to tribal lands or claims prior to the effective date of the law September 13, 1952. During congressional hearings on the law, tribes strongly opposed its passage, fearful that states would deprive them of their reservations. The State of New York disavowed any intention to break up or deprive tribes of their reservations and asserted that they did not have the ability to do so.

On August 1, 1953, U.S. Congress issued a formal statement, House concurrent resolution 108, which was the formal policy presentation announcing the official federal policy of Indian termination. The resolution called for the "immediate termination of the Flathead, Klamath, Menominee, Potawatomi, and Turtle Mountain Chippewa, as well as all tribes in the states of California, New York, Florida, and Texas." All federal aid, services, and protection offered to these Native peoples were to cease, and the federal trust relationship and management of reservations would end. Individual members of terminated tribes were to become full U.S. citizens with all the rights, benefits and responsibilities of any other U.S. citizen. The resolution also called for the Interior Department to quickly identify other tribes who would be ready for termination in the near future.

Beginning in 1953, a Federal task force began meeting with the tribes of the Six Nations. Despite tribal objections, legislation was introduced into Congress for termination. The proposed legislation involved more than 11,000 Indians of the Haudenosaunee Confederation and was divided into two separate bills. One bill dealt with the Mohawk, Oneida, Onondaga, Cayuga and Tuscarora tribes, and the other dealt with the Seneca. The arguments the Six Nations made in their hearings with committees were that their treaties showed that the U.S. recognized that their lands belonged to the Six Nations, not the U.S., and that "termination contradicted any reasonable interpretation that their lands would not be claimed or their nations disturbed" by the federal government. The bill for the Haudenosaunee Confederation died in committee without further serious consideration.

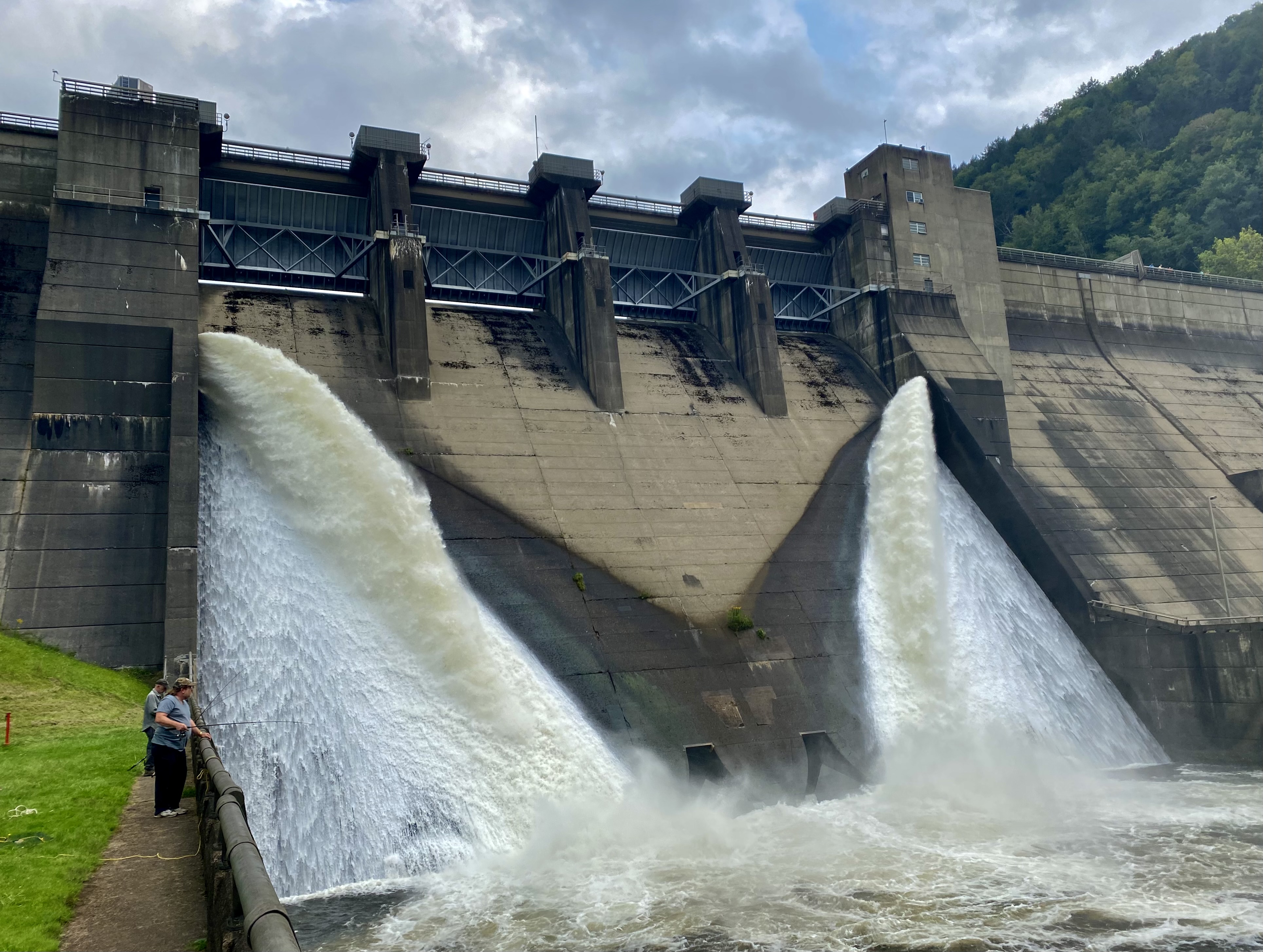
The Kinzua Dam in September 2021

On August 31, 1964, H. R. 1794 An Act to authorize payment for certain interests in lands within the Allegheny Indian Reservation in New York was passed by Congress and sent to the president for signature. The bill authorized payment for resettling and rehabilitation of the Seneca Indians who were being dislocated by the construction of the Kinzua Dam on the Allegheny River. Though only 127 Seneca families (about 500 people) were being dislocated, the legislation benefited the entire Seneca Nation, because the taking of the Indian land for the dam abridged a 1794 treaty agreement. In addition, the bill provided that within three years, a plan from the Interior Secretary should be submitted to Congress withdrawing all federal supervision over the Seneca Nation, though technically civil and criminal jurisdiction had lain with the State of New York since 1950.

Accordingly, on September 5, 1967, a memo from the Department of the Interior announced proposed legislation was being submitted to end federal ties with the Seneca. In 1968 a new liaison was appointed from the BIA for the tribe to assist the tribe in preparing for termination and rehabilitation. The Seneca were able to hold off termination until President Nixon issued his Special Message to the Congress on Indian Affairs in July 1970. No New York tribes then living in the state were terminated during this period.

One tribe that had formerly lived in New York did lose its federal recognition. The Emigrant Indians of New York included the Oneida, Stockbridge-Munsee, and Brothertown Indians of Wisconsin. In an effort to fight termination and force the government into recognizing their outstanding land claims in New York, the three tribes filed litigation with the Claims Commission in the 1950s. They won their claim on August 11, 1964. Public Law 90-93 81 Stat. 229 Emigrant New York Indians of Wisconsin Judgment Act established federal trusteeship to pay the Oneida and Stockbridge-Munsee, effectively ending Congressional termination efforts for them. Though the law did not specifically state the Brothertown Indians were terminated, it authorized all payments to be made directly to each enrollee, with special provisions for minors to be handled by the Secretary. The payments were not subject to state or federal taxes.

Beginning in 1978, the Brothertown Indians submitted a petition to regain federal recognition. In 2012 the Department of the Interior, in the final determination on the Brothertown petition, found that Congress had terminated their tribal status when it granted them citizenship in 1838 and therefore only Congress could restore their tribal status. As of 2014, they are still seeking Congressional approval.

=== Oka Crisis ===
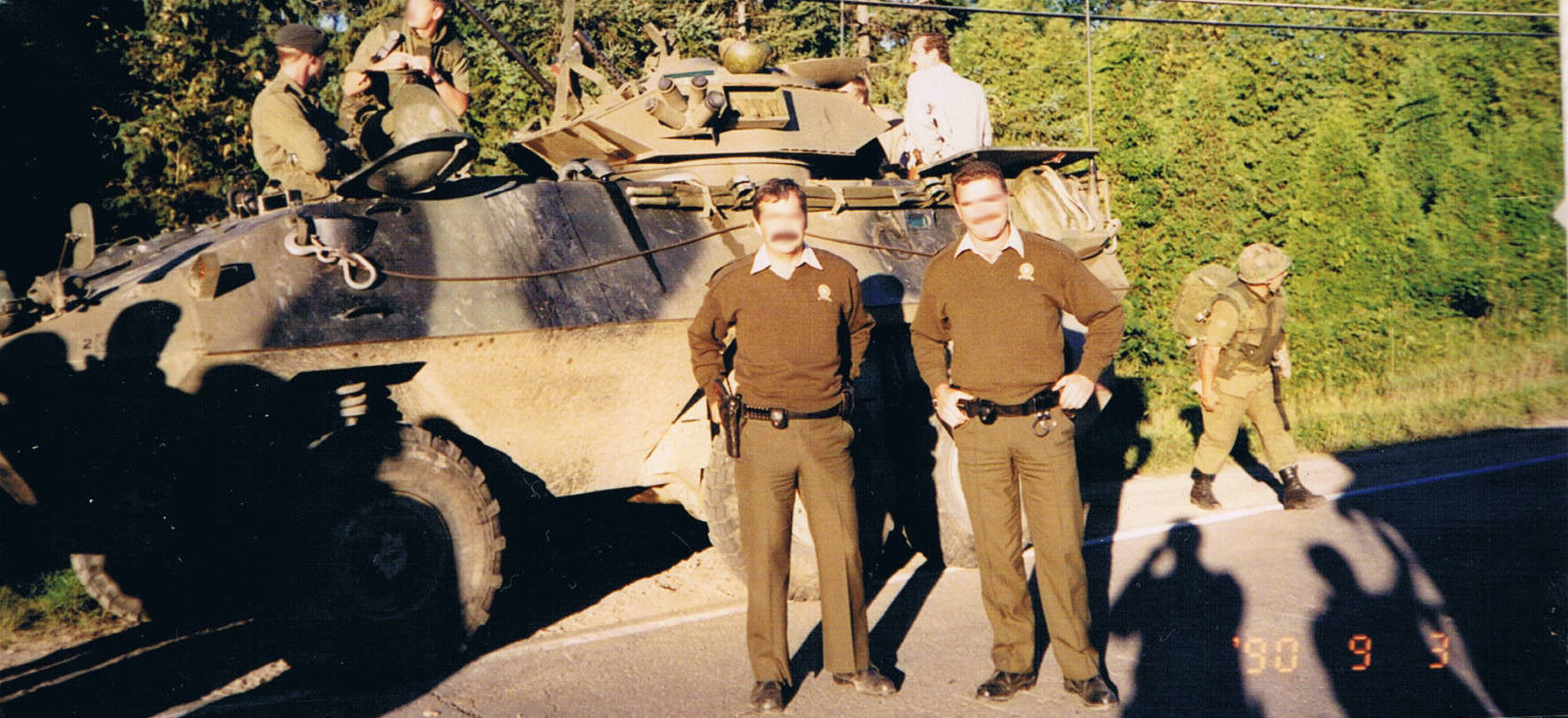
Members of the Sûreté du Québec with Canadian Armed Forces soldiers outside Oka during the crisis, 3 September 1990

In 1990, a long-running dispute over ownership of land at Oka, Quebec, caused a violent stand-off. The Mohawk reservation at Oka had become dominated by a group called the Mohawk Warrior Society that engaged in practices that American and Canadian authorities considered smuggling across the U.S.-Canada border, and were well armed with assault rifles. On July 11, 1990, the Mohawk Warrior Society tried to stop the building of a golf course on land claimed by the Mohawk people, which led to a shoot-out between the Warrior Society and the Sûreté du Québec that left a policeman dead. In the resulting Oka Crisis, the Warrior Society occupied both the land that they claimed belonged to the Mohawk people and the Mercier bridge linking the Island of Montreal to the south shore of the St. Lawrence River. On August 17, 1990, Quebec Premier Robert Bourassa asked for the Canadian Army to intervene to maintain "public safety", leading to the deployment of the Royal 22^{e} Régiment to Oka and Montreal. The stand-off ended on September 26, 1990, with a melee between the soldiers and the warriors. The dispute over ownership of the land at Oka continues.
