= Jean Peré =

French explorer, coureur des bois and merchant

Jean Peré (13 June 1639 – 1701) was a French merchant, explorer, prospector, coureur des bois, interpreter and guide.

== Biography ==
Jean Peré was born on 13 June 1639 at Arthez, France, to Guiraud Peré and Marie Dabos.

Peré arrived in Canada before 1660. Jean Talon gave 1,000 livres to Peré and 400 livres to Adrien Jolliet, and the two left in 1669 to go ascertain if the copper mine north of Lake Ontario was rich and easy to extract from. Peré seemed to be mainly concerned in collecting fur from the Ottawa and at Sault Ste. Marie: Talon complained he was slow at completing the mission. Peré discovered mines in the region around Lake Superior.

By 1673 Peré was a merchant by occupation. He married Mare Bouneau on 17 January 1673 at La Rochelle. In 1677 he was at Cataracoui. According to Duchesneau in November 1679, Peré went to Orange to sell his furs to the English, was captured by the local governor and sent to "Major Andros" at Manate. He was treated well, as the governor wanted to use him to develop trade relations with the Ottawa.

In 1684 Peré went as far as the Hudson Bay and was captured by the English. He was sent to France via England after some time. Peré quickly returned to Canada and earned the favour of Brisay de Denonville. He participated in his expedition against the Iroquois and captured many prisoners, including Ourehouare. In 1690 he was selling furs at La Rochelle.

Peré was pleading a case before the Conseil Souverain at Quebec City in 1692 and 1693. He then returned to France. He had another lawsuit in 1698–1700.

He died in 1701 and was buried at La Rochelle on August 2.

He gave his name to a river coming from Lake Nipigon; he was apparently the first European to naviguate the river as far as the Hudson Bay.
