= Teganissorens =

Teganissorens (also known as Decanesora; c. 1682 – 1718) was an influential Onondaga chief, orator and diplomat. He played a leading role in English–French–Haudenosaunee relations during the last quarter of the seventeenth and first quarter of the eighteenth centuries.

== Biography ==
He was strongly attached to the French, and in 1682 was placed at the head of a deputation of Haudenosaunee chiefs that was sent to Montreal to make terms with Frontenac and his Indian allies. It was soon discovered that the Haudenosaunee had sent Teganissorens as a blind, and were taking the field against the Illinois Confederation, while pretending to wish for peace. But the French governor dismissed him with honor, knowing that his influence did not extend to all the Haudenosaunee tribes.

He set out on a similar mission in 1688, and the preliminaries for a treaty were arranged between Denonville, the Canadian governor, and the Haudenosaunee deputies. The Hurons were dissatisfied with the proposed treaty, and, on the return of Teganissorens and his party, they were attacked by Kondiaronk, a Huron chief. Some were killed and others taken prisoners, among the latter Teganissorens, who, on complaining of this attack on an ambassador and a friend of the French, was told by Kondiaronk that the latter themselves had sent him. To show that he spoke sincerely, he at once released the Haudenosaunee ambassador. Teganissorens, however, remained loyal, and continued to render such services that he ranked with Oureouhare and Garaconthie as one of the three Indians to whom the French colony in Canada was most indebted.

He became a Christian in 1693, and in May 1694 arrived in Quebec with eight deputies. He was received with kindness by Frontenac, the governor, who gave him many presents. He proposed the restoration of Catarocouy (Kingston), and that it should be strengthened and made the bulwark of the colony. The suggestion was eagerly adopted by Frontenac, who prepared a large escort which was to conduct to that port a garrison, mechanics, and all necessary stores, but he was obliged to countermand the expedition, owing to an order from the French court. He excited the displeasure of the governor afterward by not returning to Montreal at a fixed date with the submission of some of the Haudenosaunee tribes who were holding back. But the reason of his delay was that he found his efforts to bring about a general reconciliation between the Haudenosaunee and the French abortive.

He remained at Onondaga, where he received three French ambassadors that had been sent to make a treaty with the Haudenosaunee on August 10, 1700. He afterward received both French and English agents and declared his intention of remaining neutral. Hearing in 1703 that some of the Haudenosaunee were concerting with Vaudreuil (who had then succeeded Callières in the government of the colony) an attack on the English settlements, Teganissorens went to Montreal and protested angrily against this breach of neutrality and declared that his tribe would take part for neither side. As the neutrality of the Haudenosaunee was what the French governor wanted, he assured the chief that he would not send any parties against the English in New York. Teganissorens, on his part, pledged himself to retain the missionaries that were in his country. In 1711 he informed Vaudreuil that preparations were made at New York, Albany, and Boston for an invasion of Canada.
