= Ourehouare =

17th-century Cayuga leader from Quebec

- Born: present-day New York
- Died: 1698; Quebec
- Other names: Our eau hare; Orehaoue; Hore Houasse; Goiguenha; Taweeratt
- Citizenship: Cayuga people
- Known for: Cayuga leader

Ourehouare (died 1698) was a Cayuga leader from Quebec.

Ourehouare had helped prevent the purchase of Susquehanna lands by William Penn. The Cayugas had moved from what is now the Finger Lake region of Upstate New York to present-day Prince Edward County area in Ontario before 1673.

== Captivity ==
In 1687, the French governor was Marquis de Denonville. France controlled the western fur trade, but the Haudenosaunee Confederacy, which included the Cayugas, contested the French control with the help of the English. De Champigny captured a group of Cayugas and lured another group into the fort, where they were all imprisoned. Peré captured Ourehouare and several others, and these prisoners were added to the rest. The 51 Cayugas were stripped, tied to stakes, tortured, and shipped to France. This caused an outbreak of warfare in that area of New France for over 10 years. As a result, King Louis XIV returned the captives in 1689, and replaced de Denonville with Louis de Buade de Frontenac.

== Freedom ==
Frontenac came to New France with Ourehouare and 13 other Cayuga men, all of whom had survived two years of slavery aboard the king's warships. Frontenac and Ourehouare became fast and powerful friends. He acted as the governor's ambassador in several attempts at reconciliation with the Haudenosaunee and participated in retaliatory raids. Having a Cayuga ally changed the face of the war and resulted in peace.

== Death and legacy ==
Ourehouare died in 1698. He was buried with full military honours. Had the elevation of war continued, it would have bankrupted New France and may have led to the abandonment of the colony which would have changed the course of North American history. There would have been an Indian power base allied to the English north of the future New England. At the time the French area of control included the Mississippi and Ohio river valleys, which may have stayed under Indian control. The potential impact on history would be myriad and effects the very existence of the American colonies.
