= Willem Willink =

Wealthy Amsterdam merchant (1750-1841)

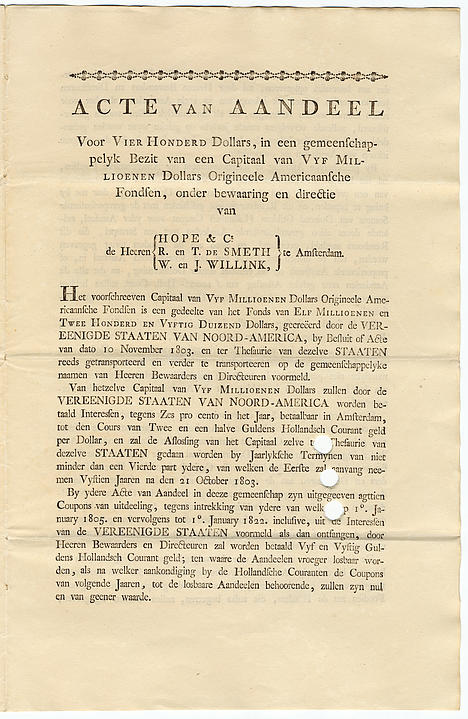
Share issued by Hope & Co. in 1804 to finance the Louisiana Purchase

Willem Willink (sometimes Wilhelm, Wilheim, or Wilhem) (1750 – 1841) was a wealthy Amsterdam merchant, and one of the investors in the Holland Land Company, and the Louisiana Purchase.

== Biography ==
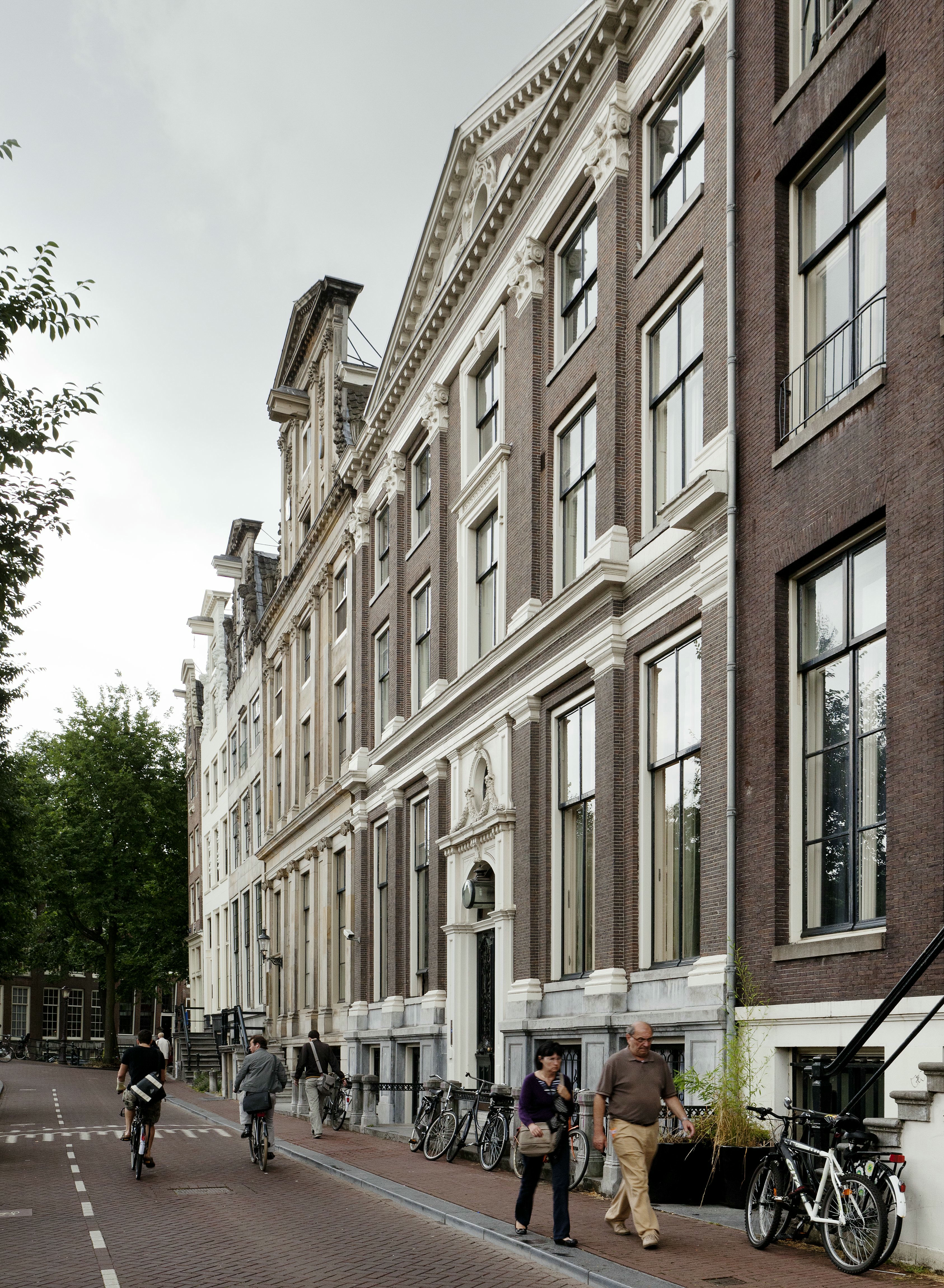
Herengracht 386

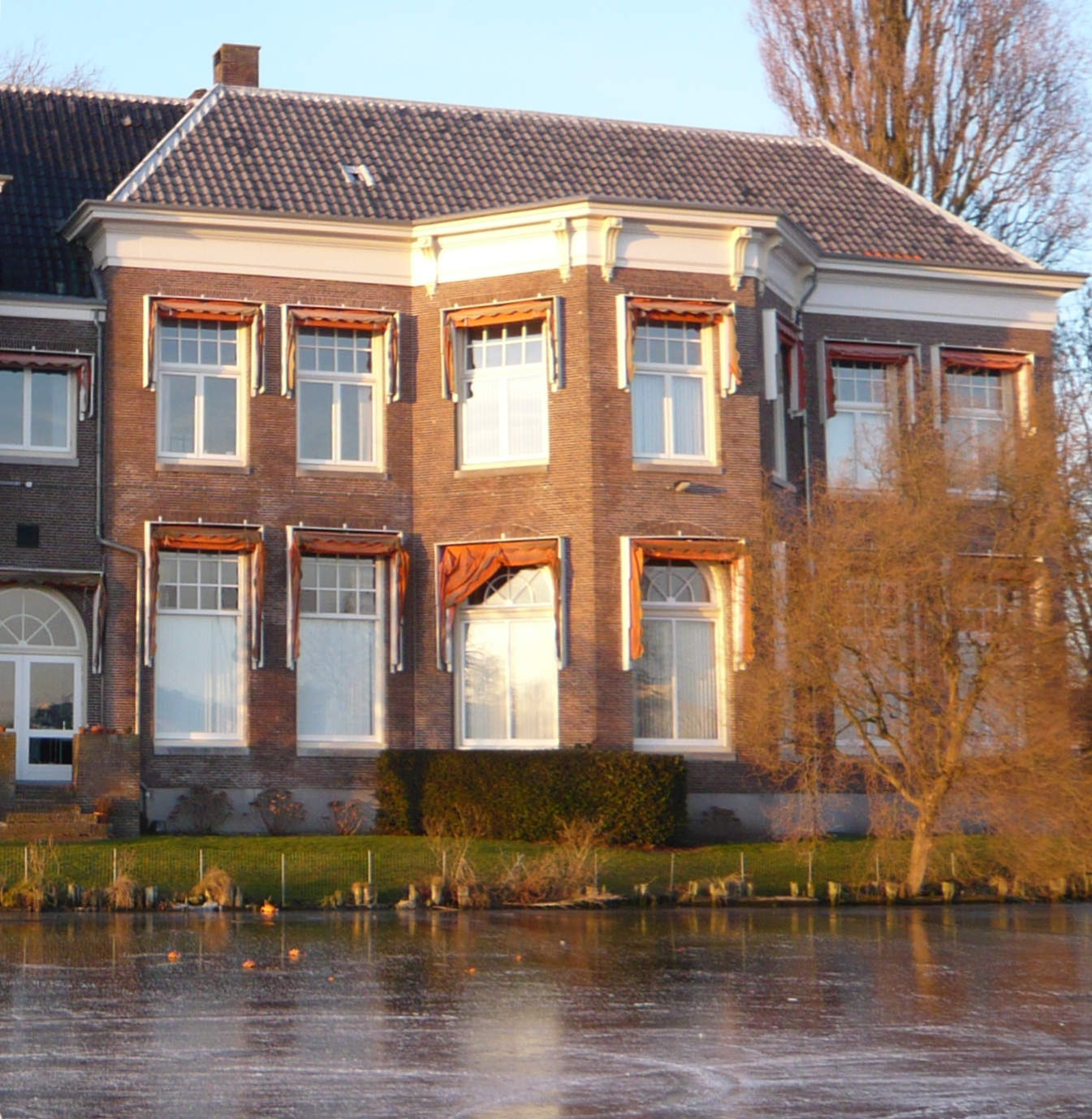
Summer home of Willem Willink on the Spaarne river

The Willink family came from Winterswijk and belonged to the Mennonite congregation. In 1775 when Willem married Hester Bierens he lived at Keizersgracht (near 268). He usually cooperated with his brother Jan (1778-1827). In 1791 they moved into a mansion at Herengracht close to Leidsegracht.

At the end of the 18th century, it became fashionable for Dutch businessmen and bankers to invest in the young United States, and many were talked into investing in land there after John Adams signed the trade treaty with the Netherlands in 1782. The group of investors in the Holland Land Company purchased American assets from Robert Morris that were bundled as negotiaties (a sort of market fund) and marketed in the Netherlands. These assets included the large tract of land in western New York plus tracts in central New York, western and northern Pennsylvania. The investments were reorganized as the Holland Land Company in 1795 with shares issued to: the Willinks (28.6%), Pieter Stadnitski (23.2%), Jan and Nicolaas van Staphorst & Nicolaas Hubbard (21.4%), Pieter and Christiaan van Eeghen & Company (14.3%), Isaäk ten Cate & Hendrick Vollenhoven (8.9%), and Rutger Jan Schimmelpenninck, politician and legal adviser (3.8%). Robert Morris was involved in land dealings with the Holland Land Company.

== Legacy ==
Willink's name was given to the Town of Willink when it was created from Batavia, New York in 1804. It was included in Niagara County when the latter was formed in 1808 from Genesee County.

The Town of Willink, along with the Town of Clarence, was taken to form Erie County in 1821. The Town of Willink was then dispersed by the formation of newer towns in Erie County (such as Concord, Eden, and Aurora). Some of the investor names appear on the Treaty of Big Tree, by which the Iroquois sold off their rights to most of the land in the Holland Land Purchase.

The names of the investors were formerly given to locations in western New York, but they have since been replaced. Buffalo, New York itself was briefly called New Amsterdam. Stadnitski Avenue in Buffalo is now Church Street. Schimmelpenninck Avenue is now Niagara Street. Buffalo streets were also named after Willink and Van Staphorst. Their names appear as the original owners on most deeds for land in this part of New York.

Their Agent General (COO) was Theophilus Cazenove, later succeeded by Paul Busti and then John Jacob Vanderkemp. Resident agents included Gerrit Boon, Adam Gerard Mappa, Joseph Ellicott, Benjamin Ellicott, William Peacock, and many others.

In 1801 Willem and Jan Willink, merchants in Amsterdam, were enabled to purchase and hold real property in the town of Havre de Grace in Harford County. Ultimately, the syndicate earned only modest profit from the investment, but their funds greatly assisted the development of the United States.

Wilhelm Willink had a summer estate on the Spaarne River, neighboring the estate villa Welgelegen of his associate Henry Hope.
