= Van der Kemp =

Van der Kemp is a Dutch surname. Notable people with the surname include:

- François Adriaan van der Kemp (1752–1829), member of the Dutch Patriots
- Johannes van der Kemp (1747–1811), Dutch missionary
- John Jacob Vanderkemp (1783–1855), Philadelphia business leader
- Ronald van der Kemp (born 1964), Dutch fashion designer
