= Cazenove =

Cazenove may refer to:

- Antoine Charles Cazenove (1775–1852), Swiss-American businessman and diplomat
- Arnold Cazenove (1898–1969), British Army officer
- Christopher Cazenove (1943-2010), British actor
- Theophilus Cazenove (1740-1811), financier and one of the agents of the Holland Land Company
- Cazenove (stock broker), British stockbroker (firm)
- Cazenove (ward), a ward in the London Borough of Hackney

== See also ==
- Casnovia (disambiguation)
- Cazenovia (disambiguation)
