= Pieter Stadnitski =

Dutch financier (1735–1795)

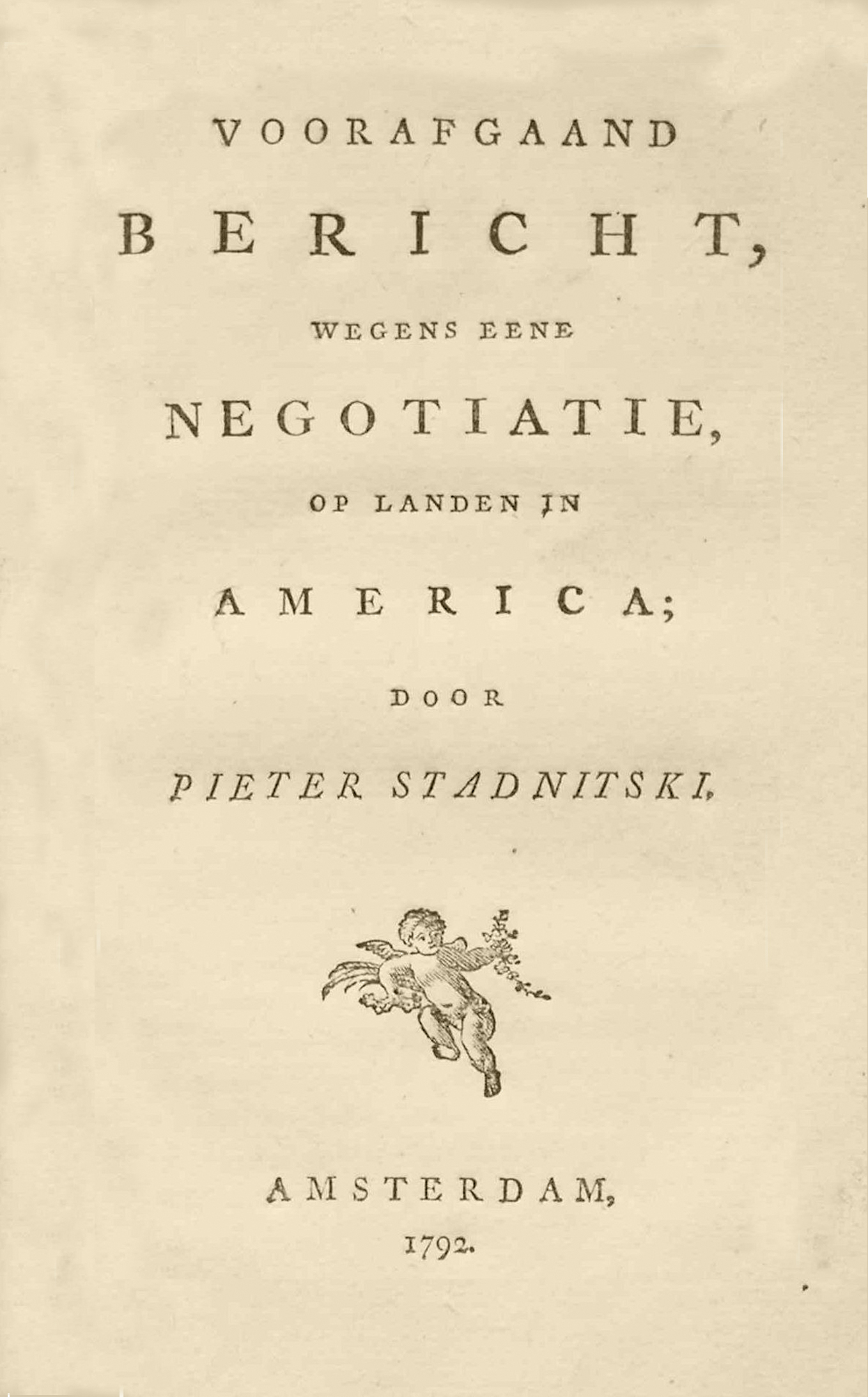
Pieter Stadnitski prospectus, 1792. Voorafgaand Bericht wegens eene Negotiatie op Landen in America.

Pieter Stadnitski (2 April 1735 – 29 November 1795) was a Dutch broker and financier who invested in the United States, including federal and state debt, canal companies, and land speculation, especially the Holland Land Company. He was the first to bring speculative American bonds – issued by the Congress to finance the American War of Independence – to the Amsterdam market in 1787. Stadnitski was co-founder in 1789 and from 1793 head of a small group of Amsterdam trading houses that bought land in the states of New York and Pennsylvania on a large scale. His role was considered significant by Thomas Jefferson.

== Life ==
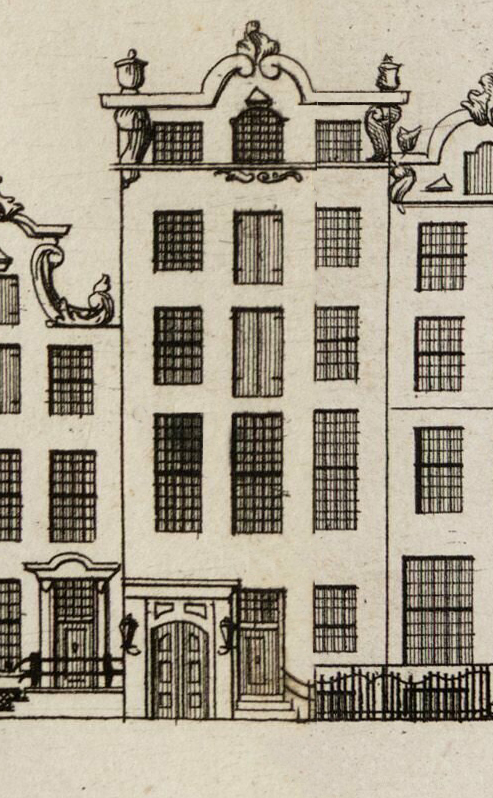
Keizersgracht 108, Amsterdam

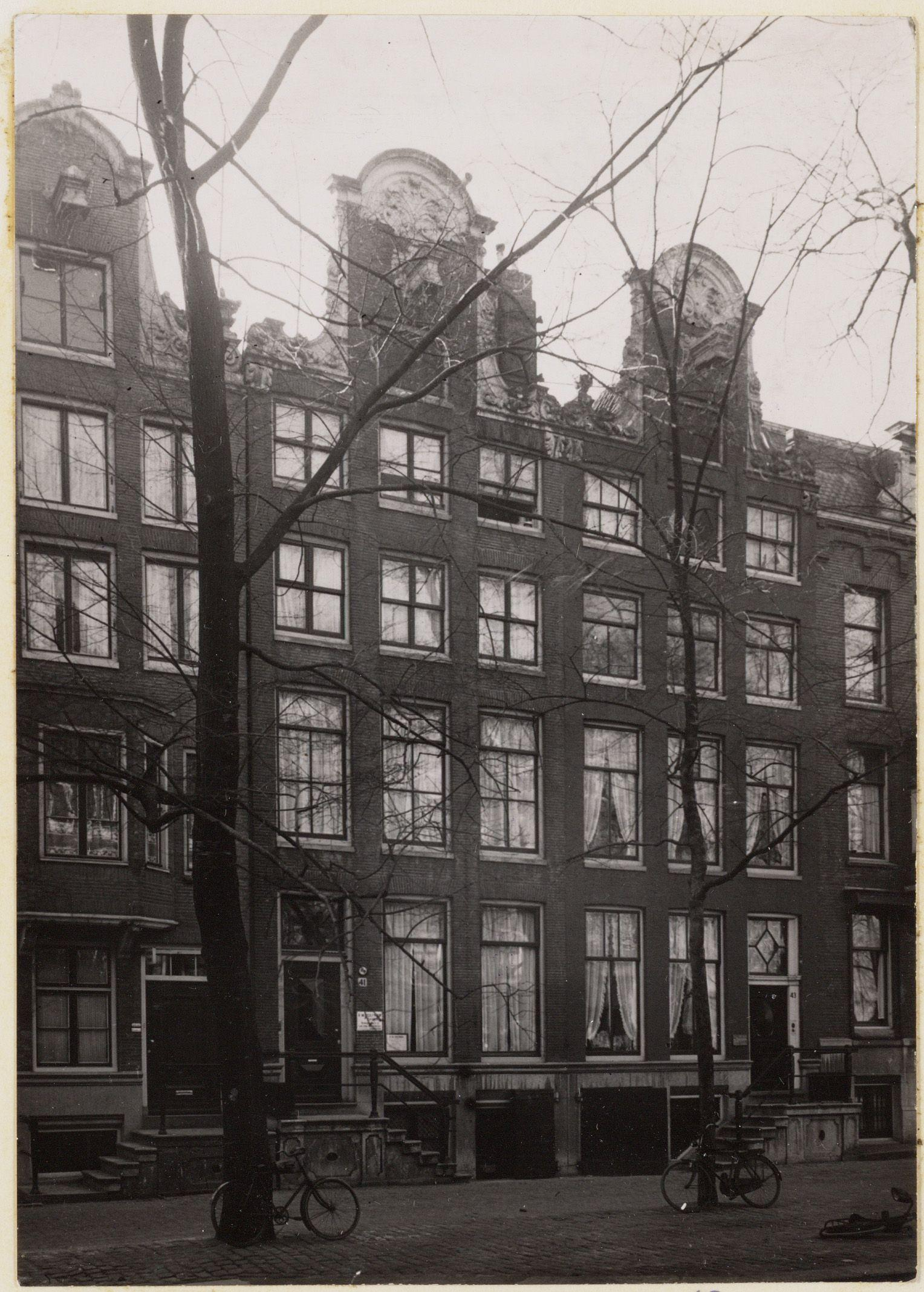
Leliegracht 39 and 41, Stadsarchief Amsterdam

Pieter Stadnitski was born 2 April 1735 in Amsterdam, the son of Jan Stadnitski (1709–1758) and Sara de Clercq (1699–1770). Her family (textile merchants) were members of the Mennonite church. His father was a deacon of the congregation in 1734–40 and 1752–57. Pieter grew up at Keizersgracht 108. He lived at Leliegracht 39 with his mother and sister when he married Christina Christina Coster (1744–1799) in 1763. The couple had five children: Sara (wife of Arend van Halmael), Jacoba (wife of Jan Fransz. van Heukelom), Jan (husband of Geertruid Brechta Uitenhage de Mist and a son-in-law of Jacob Abraham Uitenhage de Mist), Cornelia, and Andries (husband of Susanna van Heukelom). Four of them were baptized in the nearby Remonstrant hidden church.

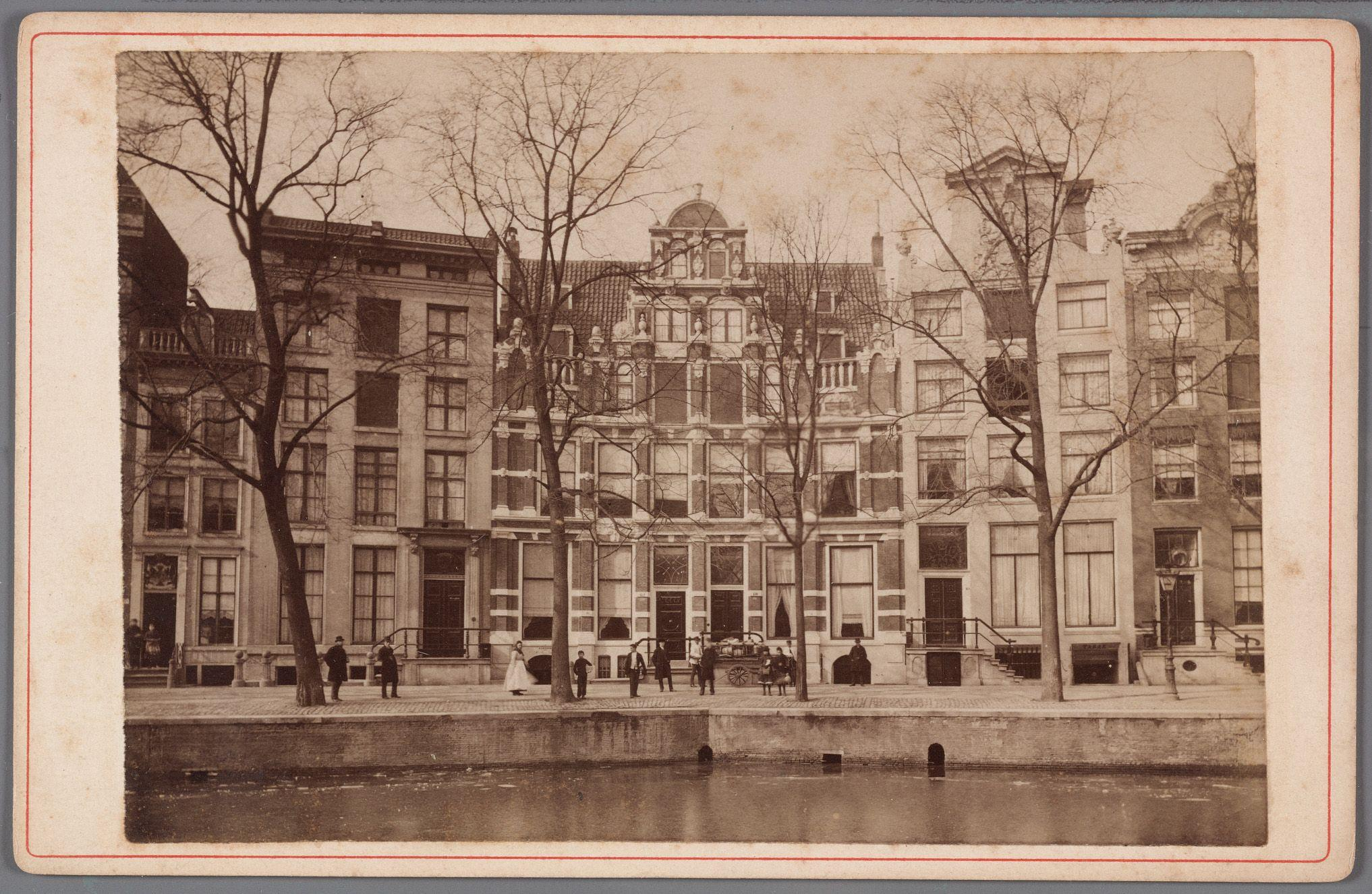
Stadnitski lived at Herengracht 170–172

From 1783 he was a member of the Vaderlandsche Societeit, a civic and democratic society. Other members whose families became associates in the Holland Land Company included Hendrik Vollenhoven, Christian van Eeghen, Pieter van Eeghen, Nicolaas van Staphorst, Jacob van Staphorst, Jan van Staphorst, Rutger Jan Schimmelpenninck, Frans van Heukelom, Nicholas van Heukelom, Jan ten Broeke Willink, Jan Ananias Willink, and Hendrik Willink. After 1785, Stadnitski was more an aristocratic than a democratic patriot. By April 1787, he had moved to a prestigious mansion at Herengracht, close to the town hall and stock market. In October, he opposed the defence of the city; after Amsterdam was invaded by a Prussian army, Stadnitsky didn't flee.

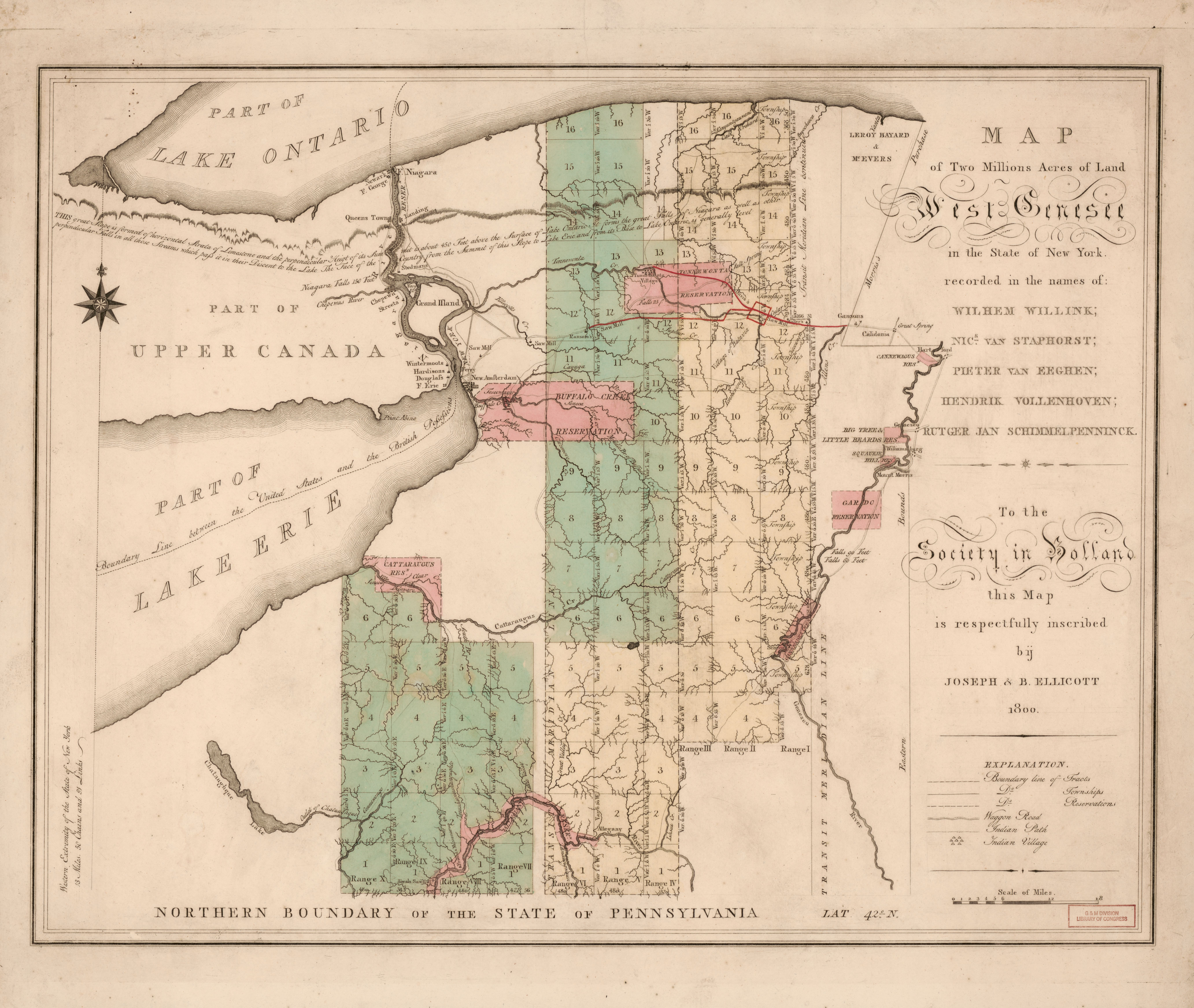
Map of two million acres of land, West Genesee County, in the State of New York – recorded in the names of Wilhem Willink, Nicolaas van Staphorst, Pieter van Eeghen, Hendrik Vollenhoven, Rutger Jan Schimmelpenninck, bought from Robert Morris

== Career ==
At end of the 18th century it became fashionable for Dutch businessmen to invest in the young United States, and many were talked into investing in land there after John Adams signed the trade treaty with the Netherlands in 1782. With the Treaty of Paris (1783) circumstances markedly improved. Stadnitski invested significantly in U.S. debt during the 1780s and bundled these into negotiaties (a mortgage fund whose loans were financed by bearer bonds held by private investors.) In 1785 and 1786 he and Vollenhoven organised a loan for France. In February 1787 the Willinks, Stadnitski and Van Berckel provided a loan of $100,000 to the US, followed in March with another one. He published: Ophelderend Bericht Wegens Het Fonds, Genaamd Liquidated Debt, of Vereffende Schulden, Ten Lasten de Vereenigde Staaten Van America. In September 1787 he was visited by Étienne Clavière and Jacques Pierre Brissot, and decided sent the latter as an undercover asset scout to Philadelphia. In the same month a loan was organized for the US. Stadnitski structured the trust as 720 shares, offered at one thousand guilders each, with a twenty-five-year expiration date. United States securities thus offered one more harbor – a relatively safe and profitable one –!in which Dutch investors could anchor their wealth.

Since 1788 Holland's finances were hopelessly in disarray; however, the rulersPieter Stadnitski (2 April 1735 – 29 November 1795) were unwilling to pay the price of full amnesty for rescuing the Patriots, living in the northwest of France and Paris. In 1788 Stadnitski managed to lure the Orangist Laurens van de Spiegel into a trap; he put him on the idea of a forced loan, and when the States-General took up the idea, he and his kindred spirits voted against it, stirred up resentment against the incumbent government and depressed Holland's bonds by stock market manoeuvres. In May 1789 they launched a loan to France, the so-called House of Four (the brothers Van Staphorst and Van Eeghen and ten Cate and Vollenhoven) decided to send Theophile Cazenove to the United States who began purchasing land in 1792; he published a prospectus, Voorafgaand bericht, wegens eene negotie, op landen in America. In early 1793, when Holland had to go deeper into debt for the Dutch East India Company and issued a 4% loan for an unspecified amount, the commercial world refused to cooperate. Again it was Stadnitski, who offered help from the Patriots on condition of a general pardon. Van de Spiegel refused the offer and Holland saved itself by demanding a liberal donation.

Stadnitski initially ran his office alone; since November 1791, together with his son-in-law under the name Stadnitski and Son (1791–1795). This investment team partnered with the Willinks and established the framework for the investments that became known as the Holland Land Company. Those investments were bundled into negotiaties in January and June 1793. The investments were reorganized as the Holland Land Company in 1795 with shares issued to: the Willinks (28.6%), Pieter Stadnitski (23.2%), Jan and Nicolaas van Staphorst & Nicolaas Hubbard (21.4%), Pieter and Christiaan van Eeghen & Company (14.3%), Isaak ten Cate & Hendrick Vollenhoven (8.9%), and Rutger Jan Schimmelpenninck, politician and legal adviser (3.8%).

The Dutch, as Alexander Hamilton fully understood, had fallen in love with American securities. Stadnitski sent several representatives to the United States to look for investment opportunities, including Jacques Pierre Brissot, Theophile Cazenove, Adam Gerard Mappa, Jan Huidekoper (older brother of Harm Jan Huidekoper), and John Lincklaen. To fulfill its engagements to the French Republic, Stadnitski joined a committee at the end of July 1795. To beat the hyperinflation it was announced that from 3 August French soldiers in the Batavian Republic would be paid in sound Dutch currency and no one could be obliged to accept French assignats anymore.

Pieter Stadnitski died on 29 November 1795 at age sixty after a short illness. He was buried on 4 December in Nieuwe Kerk (Amsterdam). After his death the business was continued on behalf of his son Jan a wealthy minor, who actually preferred to live in the countryside. From July 1797 the firm was called Stadnitski and van Heukelom. In 1804 Jan Stadnitski was dismissed by his partner; in 1904 the company was sold.

== Polish ancestry ==
Pieter Stadnitski was the grandson of Daniel Stadnitski, a cloth presser, who had migrated to Amsterdam in the late 1600s from Raków, Poland. Initially Daniel Stadnitski joined the Collegiants, but married twice a Mennonite.

Stadnitski Avenue was the original name of Church Street in downtown Buffalo, New York. Pieter Stadnitski was celebrated as a cultural figure by Polish Americans in Buffalo in the 1920 Tricentennial Mayflower parade. Piotr Stadnitski Gardens is a senior affordable housing apartment building located in the Broadway Market area of Buffalo.

== Additional sources ==
- Veru, P.T. (2018) Bonds of Independence: The Dutch Era of American Sovereign Finance, 1782–1794
- Veru, P.T. (2021). The French bonds: The little-known bidding war for France's holdings in American debt, 1786–1790. Financial History Review, 28(2), 259–280. doi:10.1017/S096856502100010X
- Rosendaal, J. (2003) Bataven! Nederlandse vluchtelingen in Frankrijk 1787–1795.
- Schama, S. (1977) Patriots and Liberators: Revolution in the Netherlands, 1780–1813, p. 59, 156, 170.
- Riley, James C. (1971). Pieter Stadnitski And Dutch Investment Banking, 1770–1815. PhD dissertation. ProQuest 302541467.
- Papers of John Adams, Vol. 19
