= Cazenovia =

Cazenovia may refer to:

== People ==
- Theophilus Cazenove, a financier and an agent of the Holland Land Company

== Places ==
- Cazenovia, Illinois
- Cazenovia Township, Woodford County, Illinois
- Cazenovia, Minnesota, a ghost town in Pipestone County
- In New York:
  - Cazenovia (town), New York
    - Cazenovia (village), New York
      - Cazenovia College
      - Cazenovia Seminary
      - Cazenovia Village Historic District
    - Cazenovia Lake
  - Cazenovia Creek, a tributary of the Buffalo River
  - Cazenovia Park-South Park System, Frederick Law Olmsted-designed park system in south Buffalo, New York
    - Cazenovia Park Hockey Association, a youth hockey organization in south Buffalo, New York
- Cazenovia, Wisconsin

== See also ==
- Casanova (disambiguation)
- Cazenove (disambiguation)
- Casnovia (disambiguation)
