= Nicolaas van Staphorst =

Dutch banker (1742–1801)

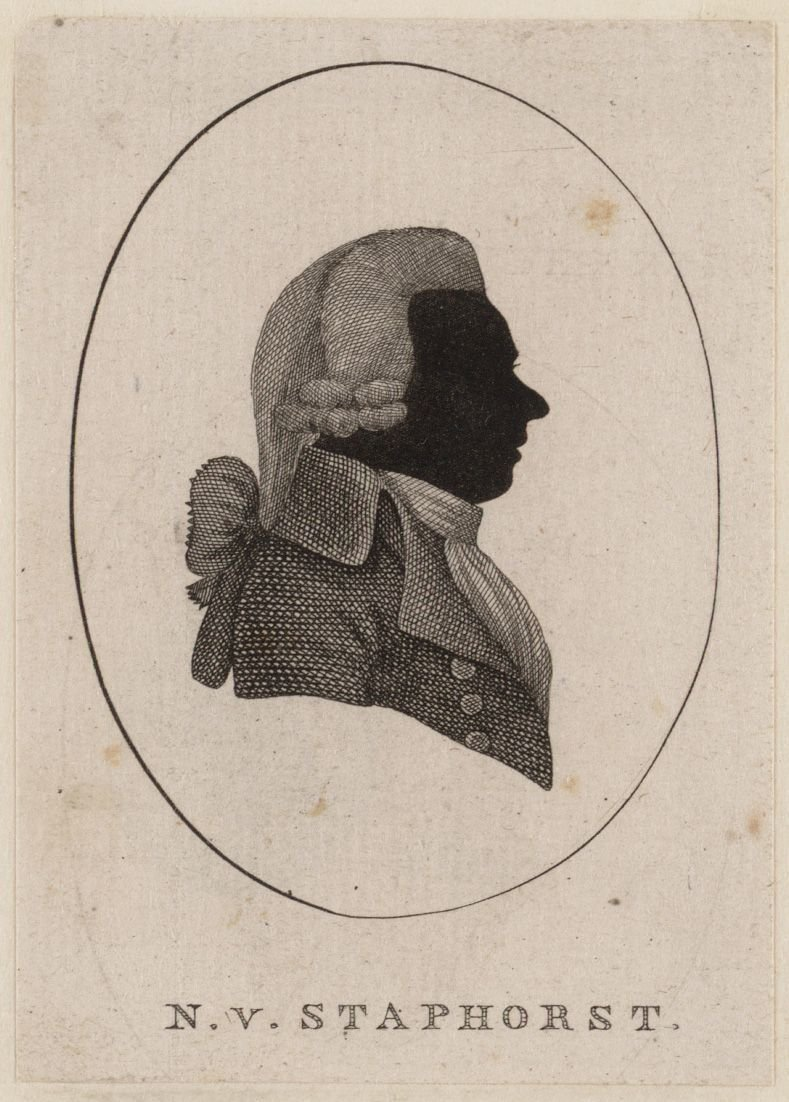
Silhouette portrait of Nicolaas van Staphorst

Nicolaas van Staphorst (January 1742 – 14 June 1801) was a Dutch banker and financier. Nicolaas and Jacob van Staphorst were involved from 1782–1794 in a total of eleven loans to the United States with a value of 29 million Dutch guilders. Van Staphorst also invested with other Dutch investment houses in a series of ventures in the United States that developed into the Holland Land Company.

== Life ==
Nicolaas van Staphorst was the son of Nicolaas van Staphorst (1702–1766) and Maria van Hasselt (1711–1755). He was born at Kalverstraat and baptized in the Nieuwe Kerk, Amsterdam on 14 January 1742. He married Maria van Beeftingh on 20 January 1780 in Rotterdam. The couple had no children. Nicolaas van Staphorst was a Dutch patriot who supported the French Constitution of 1793 and a French invasion. In 1793/1794 he held correspondence with Robespierre. In October 1794 after a weapons cache was discovered Van Staphorst decided to leave the city. He careered in the municipality and became a member of the First National Assembly of the Batavian Republic. In 1799 he retired and died 14 June 1801.

=== Career ===
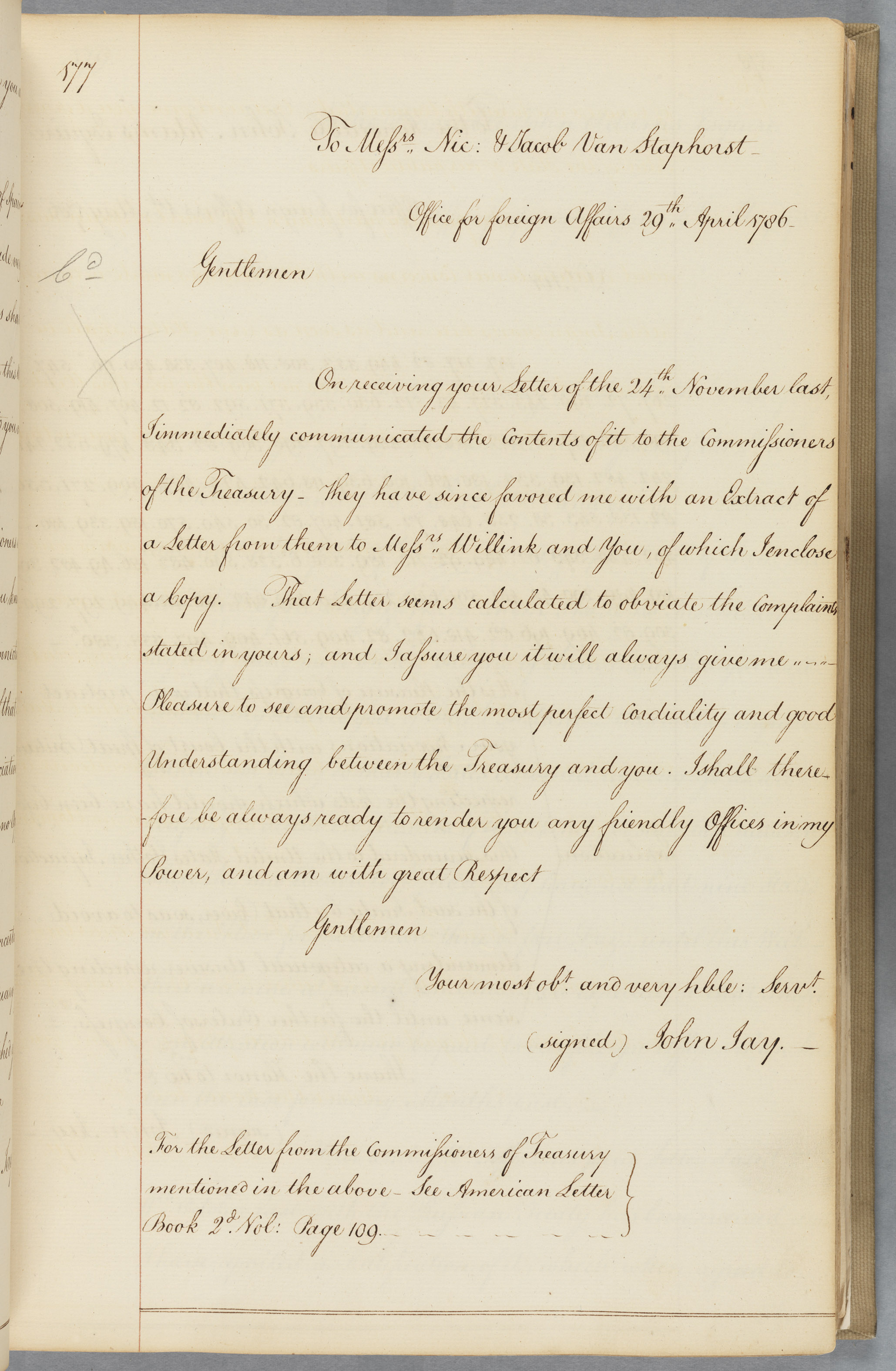
Letter from John Jay to Nicholas & Jacob Van Staphorst

In 1781 Congress appointed Robert Morris (financier) as Superintendent of Finance after the US went bankrupt. In 1782, brothers Nicolaas and Jacob van Staphorst led discussions with John Adams over a Dutch loan to the new nation of the United States of five million guilders, at that time a considerable sum. A syndicate was formed to organize the U.S.'s first foreign loan between the Staphorst brothers, the Willink brothers, and De la Lande & Fijnje. Joan van der Capellen tot den Pol was marked down for 12.000 guilders. Three other loans followed: in 1784, 1787, and 1788. Simon Schama noted: "Part of the attraction of this stock was, doubtless, the possibility of buying cheap and selling at a quick profit to investors less well informed than the brokers as to the state of American credit."

In October 1787, after the failure of the Patriot uprising, and the Prussian invasion of Holland Jacob van Staphorst fled to northern France as a prominent leader of the Dutch patriots. Nicolaas van Staphorst remained in Amsterdam, and at the beginning of 1788, Nicolaas proclaimed that "experts" must draw up a new constitution for the moment at which the patriotic revolutions would take place. After the American example, he advised that the seven regions of the Netherlands and the Generality Lands be forced to give up their sovereignty and administrations, to be replaced by a whole new constitution in which the people's influence on the election of the regents would be hugely increased. Van Staphorst told Jacques Necker that the entire French debt might be redeemed without any loss through the Amsterdam capital markets.

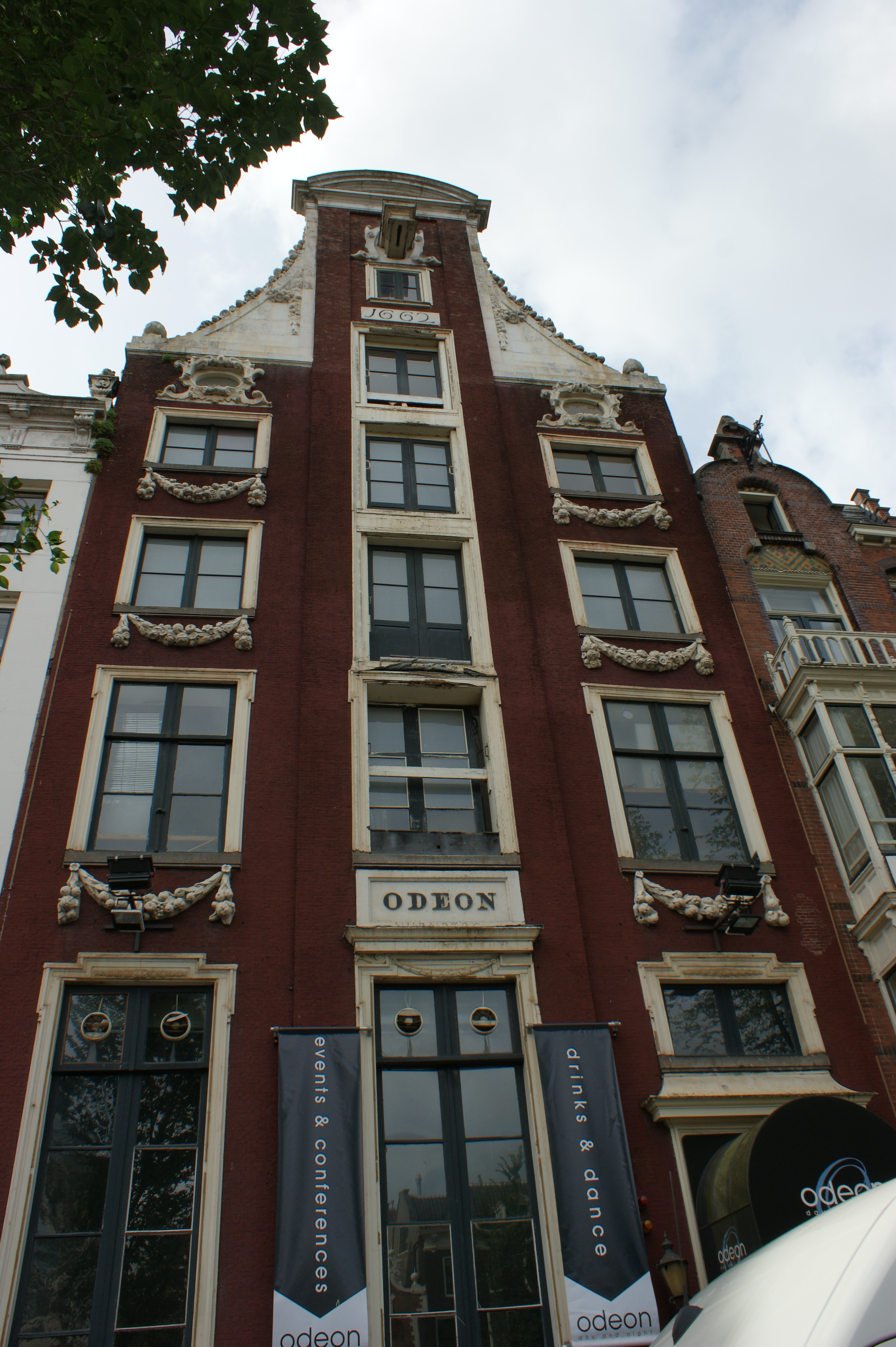
Singel 460 was bought in 1751 by his father and sold in 1790

The Van Staphorst v. Maryland case was the first case docketed with the United States Supreme Court when Van Staphorst lent money to the State of Maryland during the Revolutionary War (1782) and Maryland refused to pay back the loan according to the terms Van Staphorst demanded. After the threat of Supreme Court litigation, the parties finally settled with each other.

Thomas Jefferson took out a series of personal loans from Van Staphorst. Some of these loans used enslaved African-Americans owned by Thomas Jefferson as collateral.

Nicolaas and Jacob van Staphorst established an investment firm that included Nicolaas Hubbard from 1787 to 1802. Their firm formed a partnership with the investment firms of Pieter Stadnitski, Ten Cate & Vollenhoven, and P. & C. van Eeghen that was referred to as the Club of Four. The Club of Four invested in the United States in state bonds, canal stocks including the Patowmack Canal, James River and Kanawha Canal and Santee Canal and the S.U.M. venture by Alexander Hamilton. Investment later shifted to large tracts of undeveloped land in New York and Pennsylvania.

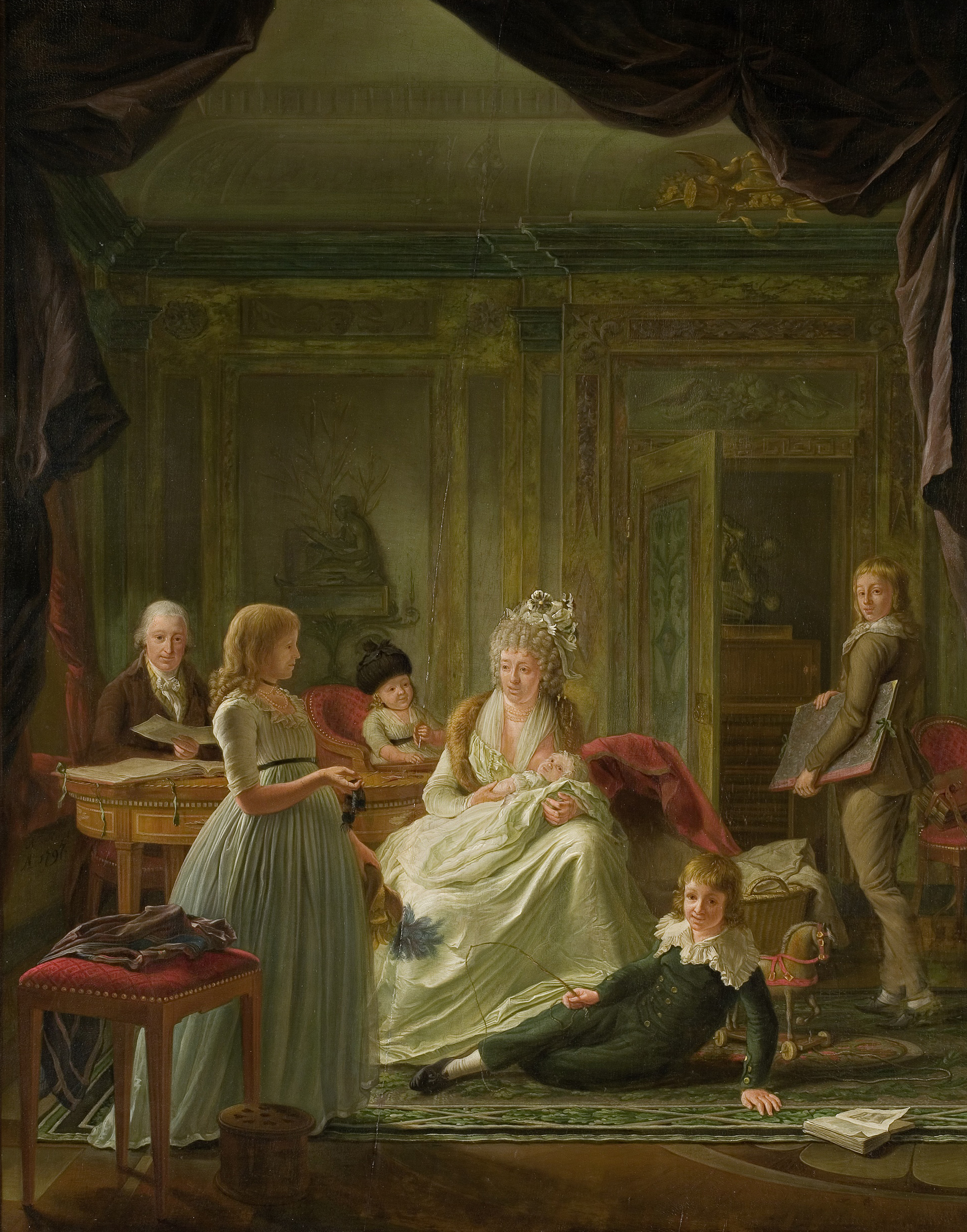
Family portrait with Aernout van Beeftingh and his wife Jacoba Maria Boon by Nicolaes Muys (1797) Rijksmuseum SK-C-1586

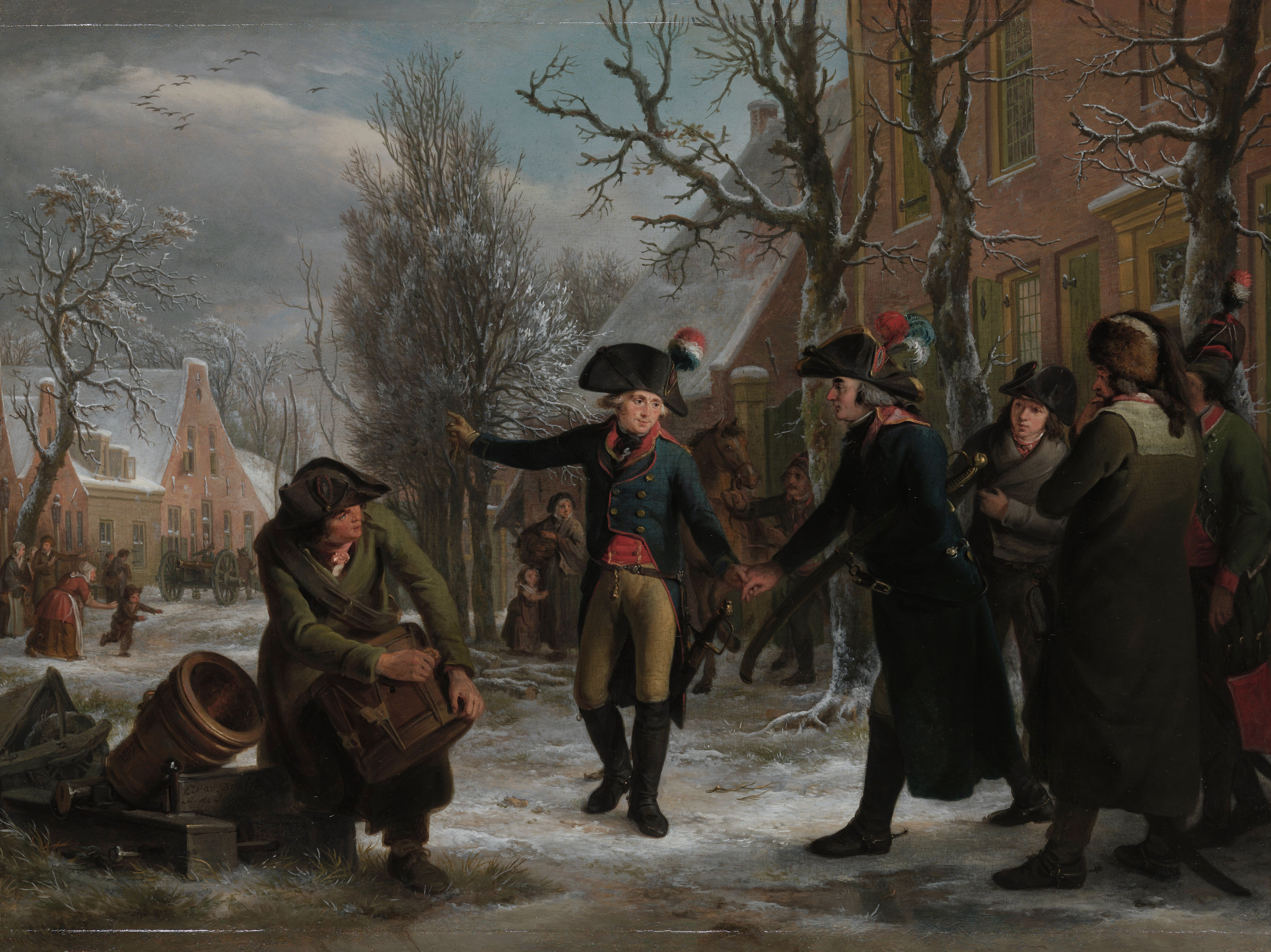
Krayenhoff in French uniform on his departure from Maarssen on Sunday morning, 18 January 1795 by Egbert van Drielst and Adriaan de Lelie

== 1790s ==
In 1791 he made an agreement with the sugar refiners Van Beeftingh & Boon of Rotterdam for a venture producing maple syrup in central New York. Gerrit Boon led the venture that failed to produce maple syrup profitably and transitioned to a land development company that established Oldenbarneveld. It was a family business; Aernout van Beeftingh was the brother-in-law to both, Gerrit Boon and Nicolaas van Staphorst.

The Club of Four made a second investment in central New York and established Cazenovia with development led by John Lincklaen. In 1794 participation in this venture in Cazenovia was reorganized as a stock venture. Ownership was proportioned as Van Staphorst and Hubbard (26%), P. & C. van Eeghen (15%), Ten Cate & Vollenhoven (15%), Pieter Stadnitski & Son (33%), and John Lincklaen (8%).

The Four Houses then partnered with the Willinks and established the framework for the investments that became known as the Holland Land Company. The Genesee Lands purchased from Robert Morris were bundled into negotiaties in January and June 1793. The investments were reorganized as the Holland Land Company in 1795 with shares issued to the Willinks (28.6%), Pieter Stadnitski (23.2%), Jan and Nicolaas van Staphorst & Nicolaas Hubbard (21.4%), Pieter and Christiaan van Eeghen & Company (14.3%), Isaack ten Cate & Hendrick Vollenhoven (8.9%), and Rutger Jan Schimmelpenninck, politician and legal adviser (3.8%).

Since September 1792 his brother Jacob lived in an apartment in Palais-Royal. He joined the "Batavian Revolutionary Committee" when in February 1793 the French First Republic declared war on Great Britain, the Dutch Republic. He met with Pierre-Joseph Cambon president of the National Convention and the Foreign minister Lebrun, discussing the future of the republic and the responsibilities of the French generals. In June 1794, during the Great Terror, he and Abbema left for Switzerland in the company of John Skey Eustace. After the fall of Robespierre they returned to Paris and met with Lazare Carnot a member of Comité du salut public and Dutch diplomats whose intention was to hasten an invasion.

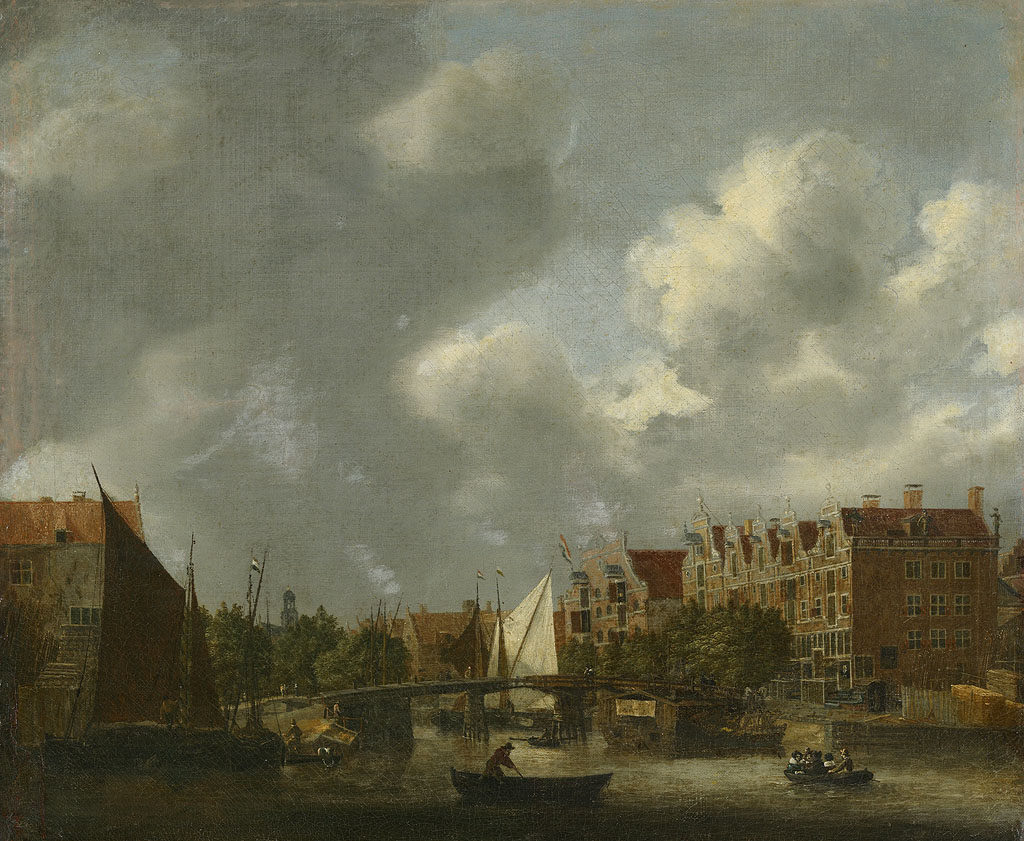
Korte Prinsengracht by Reinier Nooms; the large warehouse belonged to Van Staphorst

From 1793 Van Staphorst lived at Keizersgracht 121, next to "Huis met de Hoofden". In April 1794 he bought a warehouse nearby. On 4 October he wrote to Alexander Hamilton he was "a partizan to the rights of man, and the principles of liberty and equality". On 6 October weapons caches at Roeterseiland and near Bickerseiland were discovered. Krayenhoff and Gogel organized rifles and ammunition. Not long after, Van Staphorst publicly petitioned for revolution should either the English, retreating from Belgium, be welcomed in the city or action be taken against the encroaching French forces. Mid-October: five of them decided to hide or leave the city; Van Staphorst fled to Kampen, perhaps to Hamburg. The six others felt obliged to their party not to evade prosecution.

Pichegru began his second campaign by crossing the Meuse on 18 October 1794. In January the Armée du Nord liberated/occupied the whole of Holland. Nicolaas Van Staphorst returned from Kampen and joined the Batavian Revolution in Amsterdam. The Patriot Revolutionary Committee (with Samuel Iperusz. Wiselius and Nicolaas van Staphorst) deemed it important to liberate an important city itself, without direct French aid, to support its claims to independent authority in the Netherlands. It, therefore, sent Krayenhoff to Amsterdam, in a French lieutenant's uniform, to organize another insurrection. On Sunday afternoon 18 January 1795 – at Daendels' instruction – Krayenhoff came to tell Amsterdam's burgomasters that they had better resign the next day. They requested general Charles Pichegru to plant the liberty tree on the Dam square (during extreme cold and snowy days). On 2 February he appeared in the town hall. On 23 February, he was appointed to the Finance Committee of Holland and then to the Foreign Affairs Committee. On 12 April 1796, he left the municipality. On 3 May, he was elected as a representative to the National Assembly of the Batavian Republic.

== Van Staphorst family ==
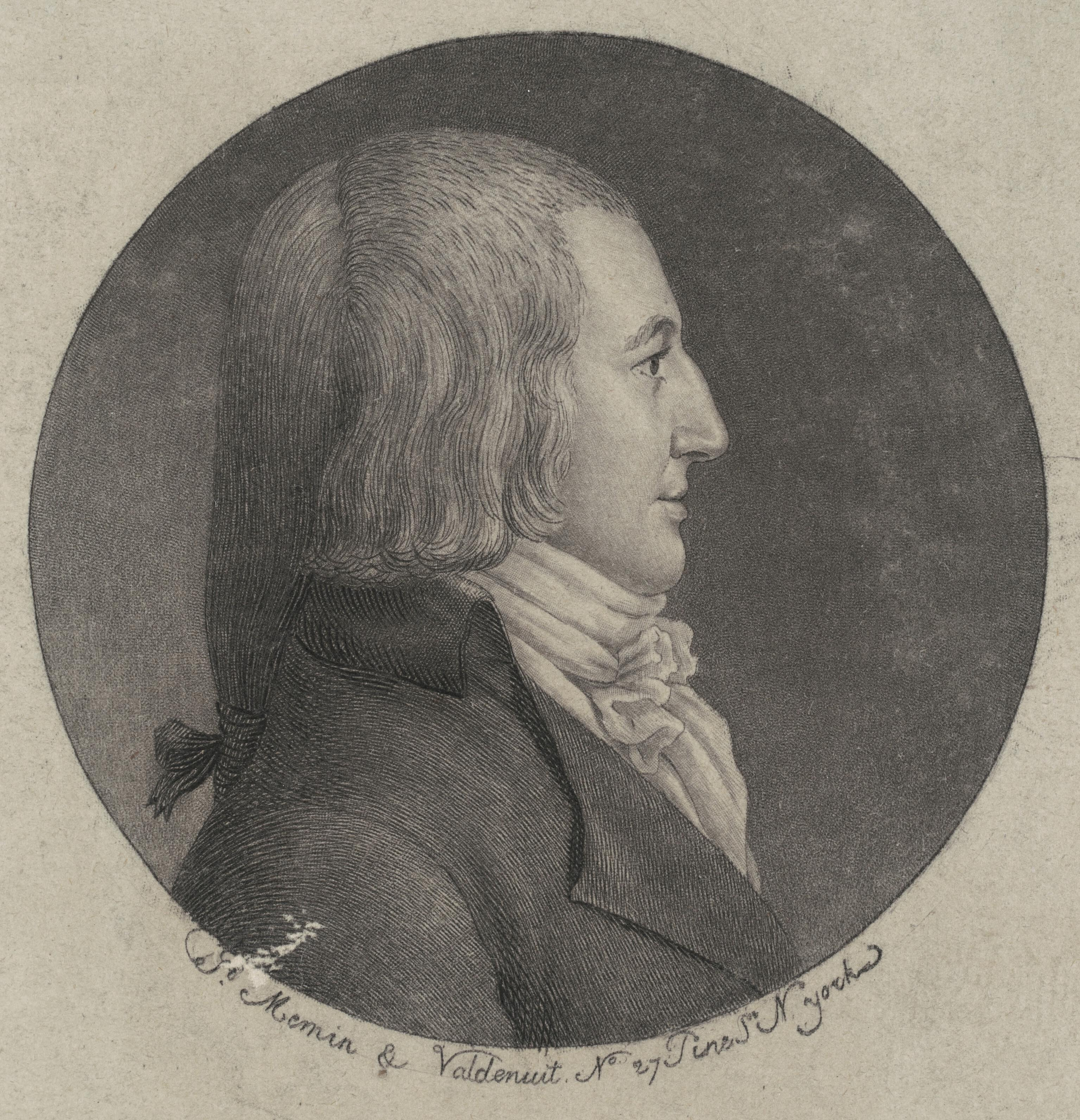
Jan Gabriel van Staphorst by Saint-Mémin, 1797

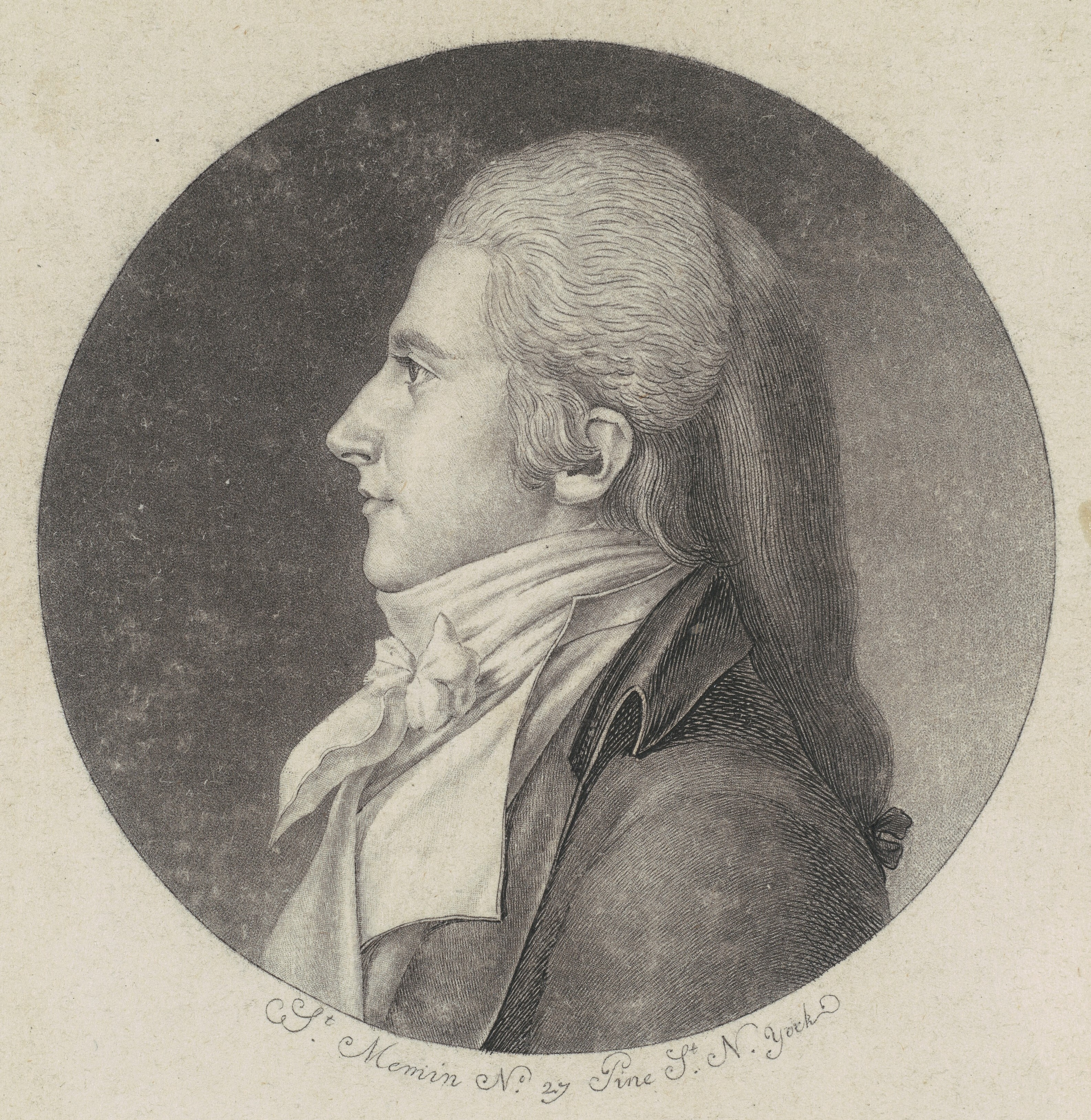
Roelof van Staphorst, Jr. by Saint-Mémin, 1797

His siblings were: Roeloff (1734), Arend (1737–1796 m. Jeanne Lelyveld), Hester (1738–1795 m1. Adriaan Mees, m2. Adriaan Caan), Maria (1740–1774 m. Pieter van Lelyveld). Nicolaas (1742-1801), Roelof (1744–1811 m. Maria Anna Martha Laffont), Jacob (1747–1812) and Jan (1748–1800 m. Magdalena Jacoba van Son).

In 1796, Nicolaas and Jacob van Staphorst's nephews, Jan Gabriel van Staphorst and Roelof van Staphorst, Jr., both sons of younger brother Roelof, traveled to the United States and were representatives of the Holland Land Company at the Treaty of Big Tree. After Hubbard left the firm in 1801 the nephews joined the company.

Jacob van Staphorst married the widow Elisabeth Charlotte Poupart from Sedan, Ardennes on 3 January 1801 in Amsterdam. The couple had no children.
