= Theophilus Cazenove =

Dutch businessman (1740–1811)

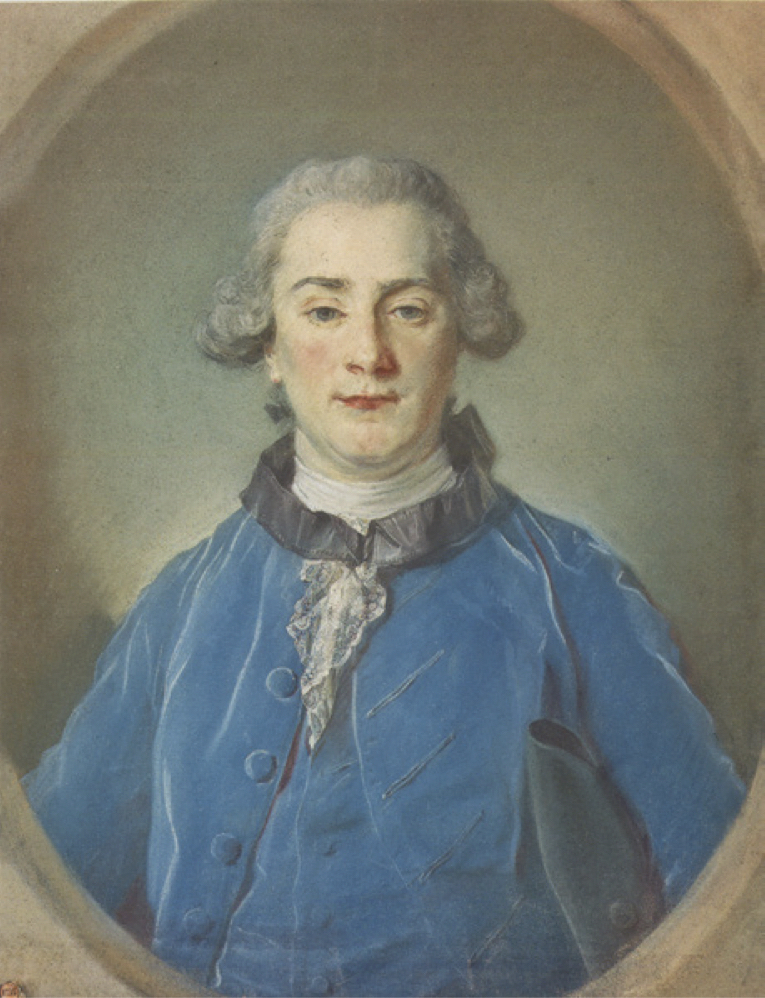
- A 1770 portrait of Cazenove
- Born: 13 October 1740; Amsterdam, Netherlands
- Died: 6 March 1811 (aged 70); Paris, France
- Spouse: Margaretha Helena van Jever (m. 1763)
- Relatives: Antoine Charles Cazenove (cousin)

Theophilus Cazenove or Theophile Cazenove (13 October 1740 – 6 March 1811) was a Dutch financier and one of the agents of the Holland Land Company.

== Life and career ==
Theophilus Cazenove was baptized in the Westerkerk in Amsterdam as the son of Théophile Cazenove (–1760) and Marie de Rapin-Thoyras, both French/Swiss Huguenots. The couple had seven children.

His grandfather was Paul de Rapin, a historian, who fled to the Netherlands. His father was a merchant-banker who traded on Bordeaux, Saint Petersburg, Arkhangelsk, Stockholm, and the West Indies. In 1759 he lost four ships loaded with sugar and coffee, which were taken by a Bristol privateer. In 1760, the elder Théophile gave up his business and his sons Charles and Theophile the Younger assumed control of the company. In 1762 Charles was involved in a fight with Marc-Michel Rey, the publisher of Rousseau.

== Career ==
Cazenove spent his early career in commercial transactions in France and Russia, but went almost bankrupt during the Amsterdam banking crisis of 1763, collaborating with L.P. de Neufville and Hope & Co. Only a few weeks later he married Margaretha Helena van Jever (1747–1833), the daughter of a tradesman in Russia, and a member of the vroedschap. The couple lived at Raamgracht with a view on Zuiderkerk, but in 1766 they sold the house and his mother, who remarried in 1763, had moved to Vevey. Theophile was involved in a plantation in Surinam with his father-in-law. In 1770, he had his portrait painted by Jean-Baptiste Perronneau. In 1788, he collaborated with Étienne Clavière and Jacques Pierre Brissot, who both traveled to the United States.

In November 1789, Cazenove was retained by Pieter Stadnitski to travel to the United States to act as an investment agent for Stadnitski and other Dutch investors, including Nicolaas and Jacob Van Staphorst, Pieter & Christiaen Van Eeghen, and Ten Cate & Vollenhoven. Casenove settled in at Market Street in Philadelphia, where he dealt with financier Robert Morris; his fellow traveller Gerrit Boon later went north. Boon believed that harvesting maple syrup could be a year-round activity, so slavery on the sugarcane plantations could be avoided.

In 1792, Cazenove invested his clients' money in development bonds issued by the new states and the federal government, after Alexander Hamilton promised to pay the debt in full. Another venture included investing in large tracts of undeveloped land in Genesee County, New York, which included the Holland Purchase. In order to implement these large and difficult purchases (sometimes complicated by the claims of Native Americans), he employed the advisory services of Hamilton and, later, Aaron Burr.

Cazenove lived well as a "grand seigneur" and was known for his extreme carelessness. His business dealings in maple syrup and canals were not particularly successful and the investors barely made any profit, even losing money in the Pennsylvania land dealings which he organized with James Wilson. He was also hard-pressed to account for funds that were under his control. During this period he helped his cousin from Geneva, Antoine Charles Cazenove, settle in Philadelphia. Alexander Baring wrote: "Cazenove is a sad dirty fellow and does all the mischief he can." In 1798, he hired Joseph Ellicott, to survey the Holland Land Purchase; Paul Busti became his successor in 1799.

Although he became an American citizen in 1794, Cazenove returned to Europe in 1799. In Amsterdam, he began to archive purchase of land for the financiers. He left the employment of the Dutch investors in 1802 and sought a position under Charles Maurice de Talleyrand-Périgord, who he had met in Philadelphia in 1795. Cazenove died on 6 March 1811 in Paris at the Hôtel de Galliffet, 84 rue du Bac, owned by Talleyrand.

=== Legacy ===
Cazenove's correspondence, along with the records of the Holland Land Company, is held in the Amsterdam City Archives.

A number of locations in New York state are named after him, including the Village of Cazenovia, Town of Cazenovia, Cazenovia College, Cazenovia Lake, and Cazenovia Creek.
