= Cora H. Clarke =

American botanist and entomologist (1851–1916)

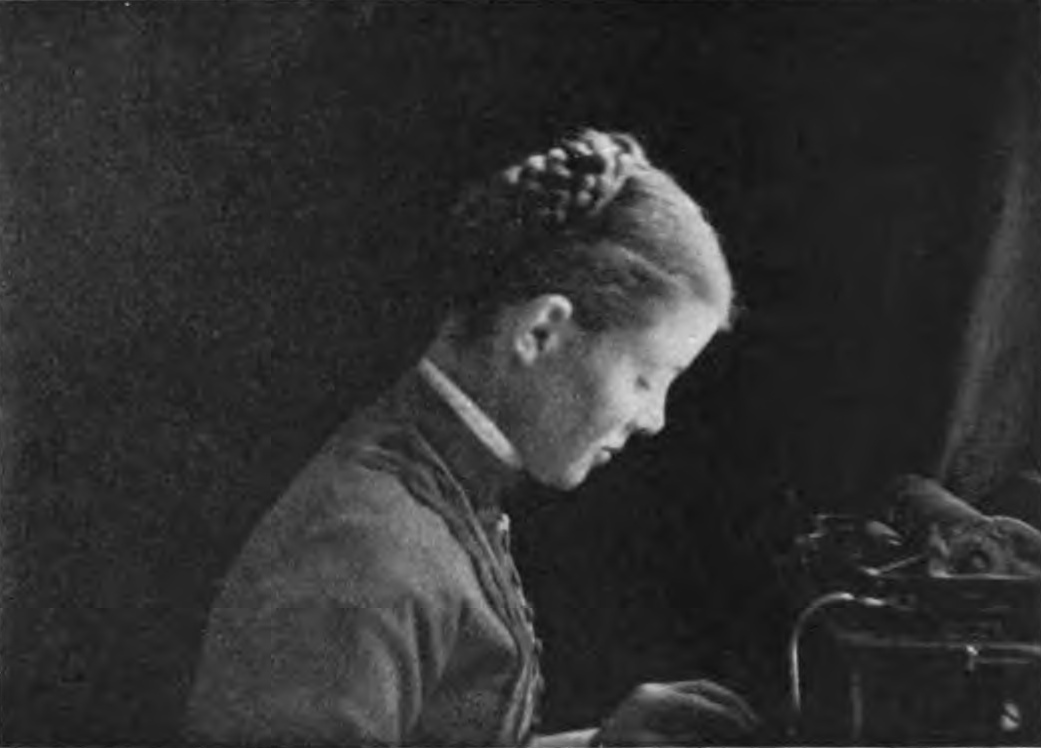
Cora H. Clarke

Cora Huidekoper Clarke (February 9, 1851 – April 2, 1916) was an American amateur entomologist, science educator and botanist specializing in bryophytes. Her chief entomological studies were on galls caused by wasps (Cynipidae) and flies (Cecidomyiidae), which she reared, photographed and documented, with several new species being described from the collections that she made.

Cora was born in Meadville, Pennsylvania to Anna (Huidekoper) and Reverend James Freeman Clarke, a Unitarian minister and anti-slavery activist, who founded Church of the Disciples in Boston. Her grandfather, Harm Jan Huidekoper, was the founder of the Meadville Theological School. James Freeman Clarke had been educated at the Harvard Divinity School and was noted for his activism towards women's education as well as a coeducation policy at Harvard. The family moved to Boston around 1854 and after the death of her parents, she moved to Mt Vernon Street in Boston where she lived until her death. Due to poor health, she was taught at home until the age of thirteen. She studied at a horticultural school in Newton and at the Bussey Institution in Jamaica Plain, Boston where she was taught by Francis Parkman. She taught at Miss Ticknor's Society and founded a Science Club and led a botany group at the New England Women's Club. She was a member of the Cambridge Entomological Club, the Sullivant Moss Society, the Boston Society of Natural History, and a Fellow of the American Association for the Advancement of Science (elected 1884).

Among her scientific contributions were studies on gall insects, especially Cynipidae which she reared and used her photography skills to document. Two new species were dedicated to and named after her by H. F. Bassett. She also studied Cecidomyiid galls and reared many species, some of which were described by E. P. Felt; three named after her. She also made a study of caddis-fly larvae and their cases.
