= John Jacob Vanderkemp =

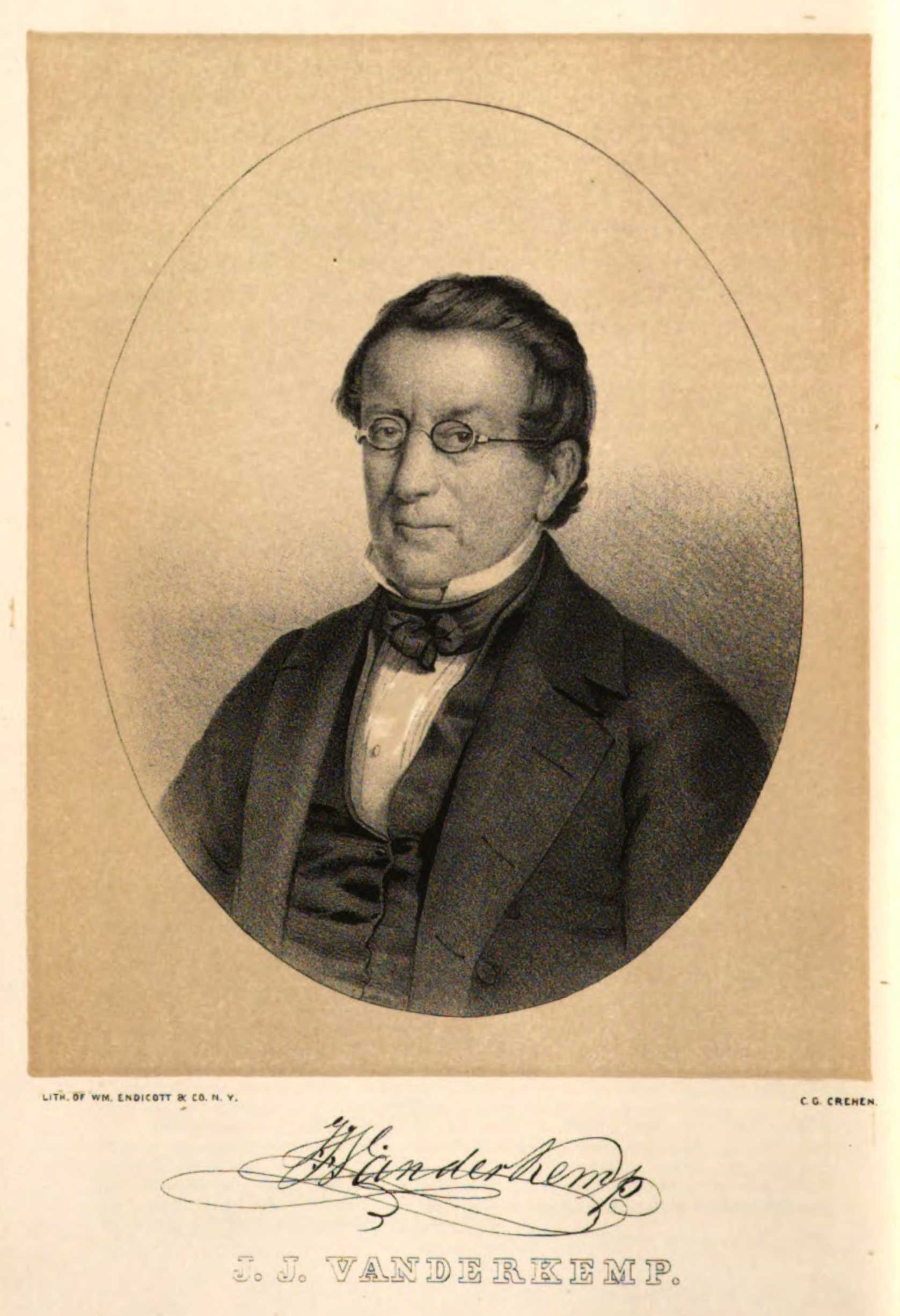
John Jacob Vanderkemp

John Jacob Vanderkemp (April 22, 1783 – December 4, 1855) was the Agent General (COO) of the Holland Land Company, one of the largest foreign investments during the early history of the United States of America. He was also a manager of the Philadelphia Savings Fund Society and was a prominent citizen of Philadelphia during the first half of the nineteenth century.

Vanderkemp was elected on 17 January 1840 as a member of the American Philosophical Society.

== Career ==
Vanderkemp took a position in Philadelphia in 1804 replacing Harm Jan Huidekoper as the assistant to Paul Busti, Agent General of the Holland Land Company. He served as assistant until Busti's death in 1824 when Vanderkemp succeeded him. Vanderkemp then served as Agent General until the liquidation of the Holland Land Company's investments in the mid-1840s.

Vanderkemp served as the Chairman of Investments and on the Committee of Finance directing the Philadelphia Savings Fund Society, working for this institution from 1819 to 1855. Vanderkemp served as a director of the Second Bank of the United States from 1837 to 1839 during the management of Nicholas Biddle. Vanderkemp was also a director of the Pennsylvania Company for Insurances on Lives and Granting Annuities.

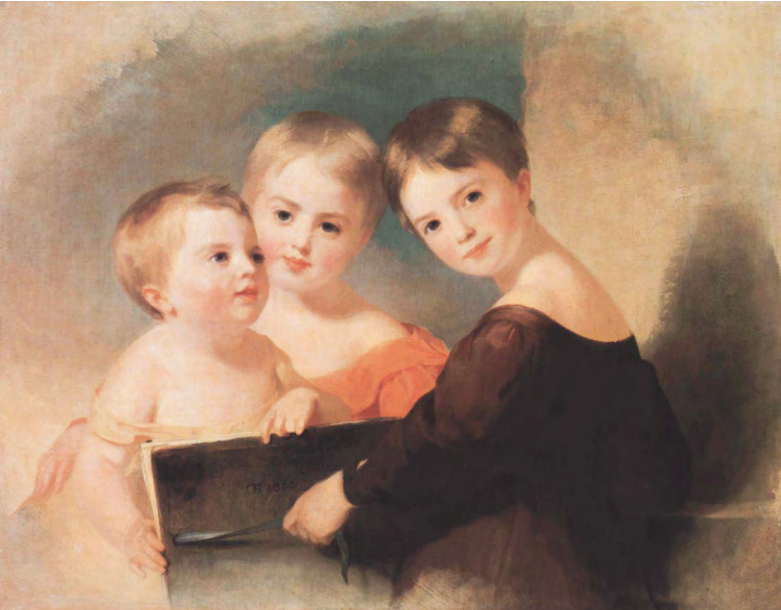
Thomas Sully. The Vanderkemp Children (L-R John Jacob, Bertha Frances and Pauline), 1838. Collection of National Gallery of Art, Washington D.C.

== Life ==
Vanderkemp was the eldest child of the Dutch radical leader François Adriaan van der Kemp and Reinira Engelbartha Johanna Vos. His family emigrated as political refugees arriving in New York City in 1788. The family first lived in Kingston, New York, then in the wilderness at Kempwick (Constantia (town), New York) on Oneida Lake (1793-abt 1798) before settling at Barneveld, New York in Oneida County.

In 1809, he married Julia (Juliana) Taylor, of Philadelphia. They had two sons, Francis Adrian Vanderkemp (1810–1832) and John Vanderkemp (1812–1816). Julia (Taylor) Vanderkemp died in 1824. F. Adrian Vanderkemp, named for his paternal grandfather, graduated from the University of Pennsylvania in 1829 and died in unknown circumstances in Hedionda near Saltillo, Mexico in 1832.

In 1825, Vanderkemp married Eliza Duffield Hepburn of Philadelphia. They had three children, Pauline Elizabeth Vanderkemp Henry (1826–1905), Bertha Francis Vanderkemp (1827–1844) and John Jacob Vanderkemp, Jr. (1829–1897). A portrait of their children painted by Thomas Sully in 1838 is part of the collection of the National Gallery of Art.

Vanderkemp died in Philadelphia at age seventy-two in 1855.

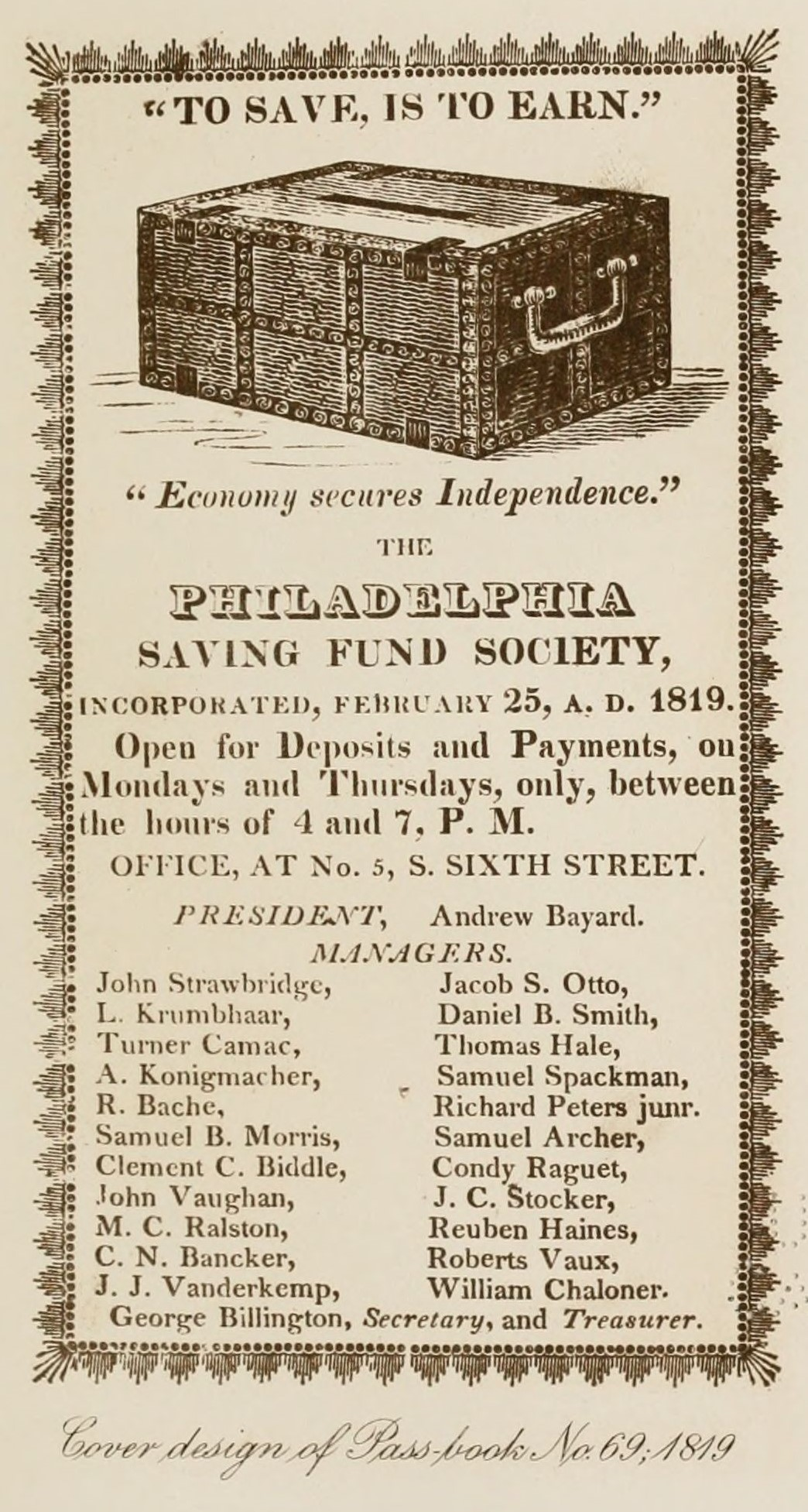
PSFS Passbook cover
