= Casnovia =

Casnovia can refer to a location in the United States:

- Casnovia, Michigan, a village
- Casnovia Township, Michigan

== See also ==
- Cazenovia (disambiguation)
- Cazenove (disambiguation)
