= John Lincklaen =

Dutch American land developer

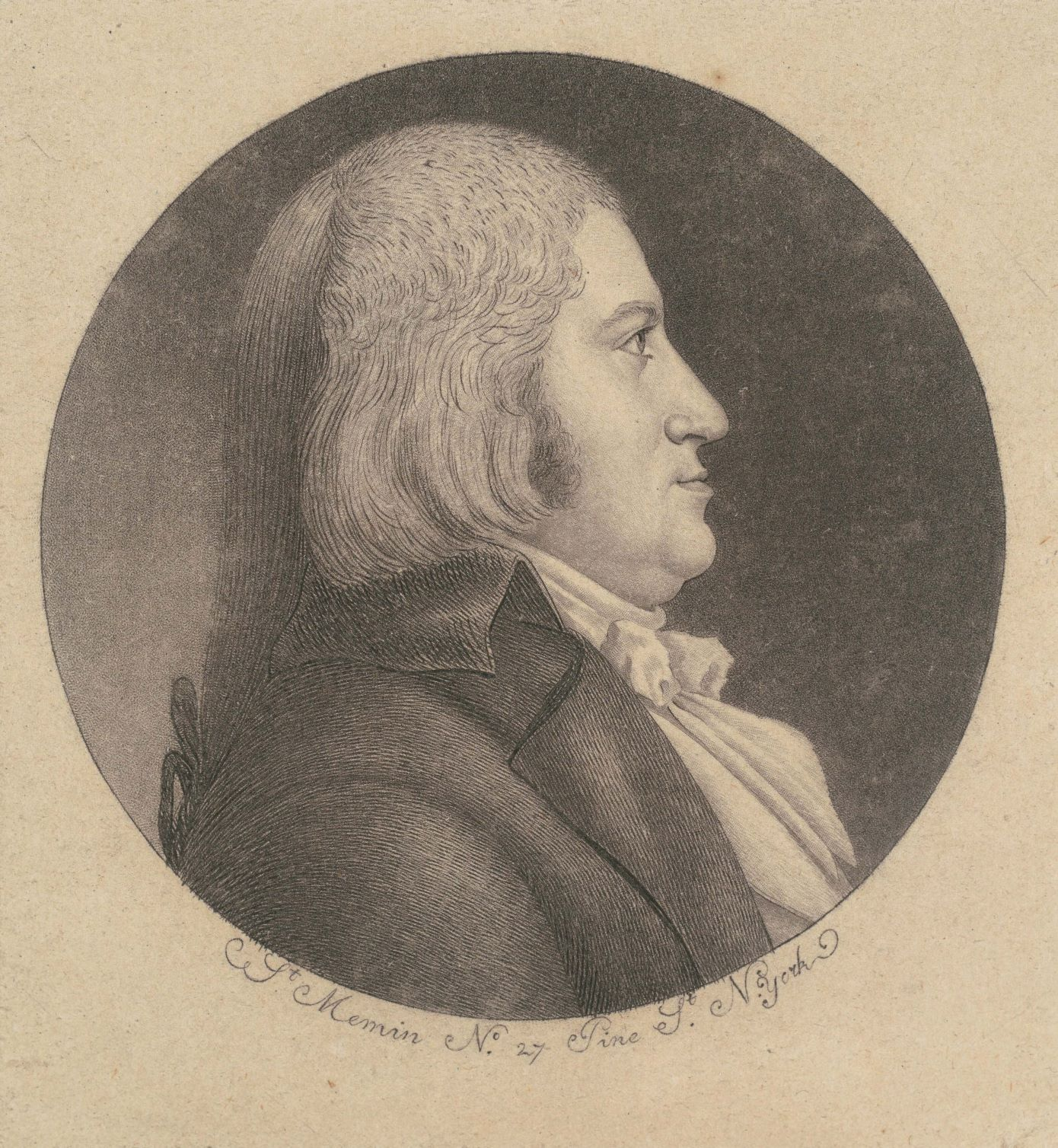
John Lincklaen portrait

John Lincklaen (24 December 1768 – 9 February 1822) was the founder of Cazenovia, New York. Lincklaen was the Resident Land Agent for the Holland Land Company in Cazenovia, New York, and later the owner and sales agent for the same tracts. A bronze statue of Lincklaen by Dexter Benedict was installed in 2018 in Lakeland Park in Cazenovia, New York.

== Early life and career in Holland ==
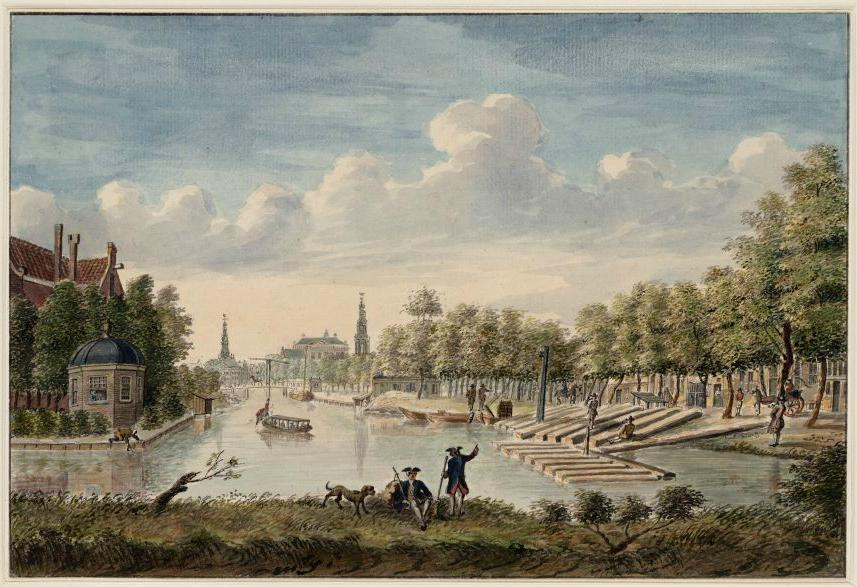
View on Plantage Muidergracht and Roeterseiland on the left, the area where Lincklaen grew up, drawing by Jan Schouten ca. 1749

Jan Lincklaen was baptized on 24 December 1768 at home. His parents, wealthy Lutherans, were Anthonij Quiryn Lincklaan, and Geertruij Hoeven, who died in 1782 and 1783. At age thirteen, Jan Lincklaen joined the navy and in February 1786 he was commissioned as a lieutenant. In 1790 he received leave to travel to America as a representative of the Dutch investor Pieter Stadnitski.

== Career in the United States ==
In 1790 John Lincklaen and Gerrit Boon were sent to evaluate land tracts for Theophile Cazenove who was the representative of the Holland investors. In 1791-1792 Lincklaen traveled through frontier lands in Pennsylvania, New York and Vermont; his journals were translated and published in 1897. In 1793 the House of Four Investors from Amsterdam purchased 124,288 acres of land. John Lincklaen settled in the newly established community of Cazenovia and was appointed as a land agent.

In 1794 participation in the venture in Cazenovia was reorganized by the Four Houses as a stock venture. Ownership was proportioned as: Van Staphorst and Hubbard (26%), P. & C. Van Eeghen (15%), Ten Cate & Vollenhoven (15%), Pieter Stadnitski & Son (33%), and John Lincklaen (8%). The shares transferred to Lincklaen were from those attributed to Stadnitski.

In 1818 this stock venture was purchased by John Lincklaen after extended negotiations with Paul Busti, the Agent General for the Holland Land Company.

== Family Life ==
In 1797 John Lincklaen married Helen Ledyard (1777-1847) a daughter of Major Benjamin Ledyard, a veteran of the Revolutionary War. The couple built a mansion in Cazenovia along the lake, named Lorenzo, that is now a New York State Historic Site. The couple had no children and adopted Jonathan Denise Ledyard and others of her family. J. D. Ledyard succeeded Lincklaen as Land Agent after the death of John Lincklaen on 9 February 1822 in Cazenovia, New York.

The Lincklaen were slave owners. Helen Ledyard had brought enslaved siblings with her when she married John Lincklaen in 1797. Caesar, Juli-ann and Titus Johnson were among the five enslaved African Americans in the Lincklaen household in the 1800 U.S. census, there were three enslaved people in their household in 1810, and one enslaved person in 1820.
