= Van Eeghen =

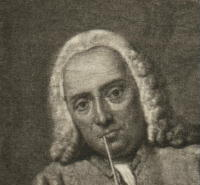
Christiaen van Eeghen (1700-1747)

van Eeghen is a surname. Notable people with the surname include:

- Isabella Henriette van Eeghen (1913–1996), Dutch historian
- Esmée van Eeghen (1918–1944), Dutch resistance fighter in World War II
- Mark van Eeghen (born 1952), American football player
- Hester van Eeghen (1958–2021), Dutch designer
