= Harm Jan Huidekoper =

American businessman, and theologian (1776–1854)

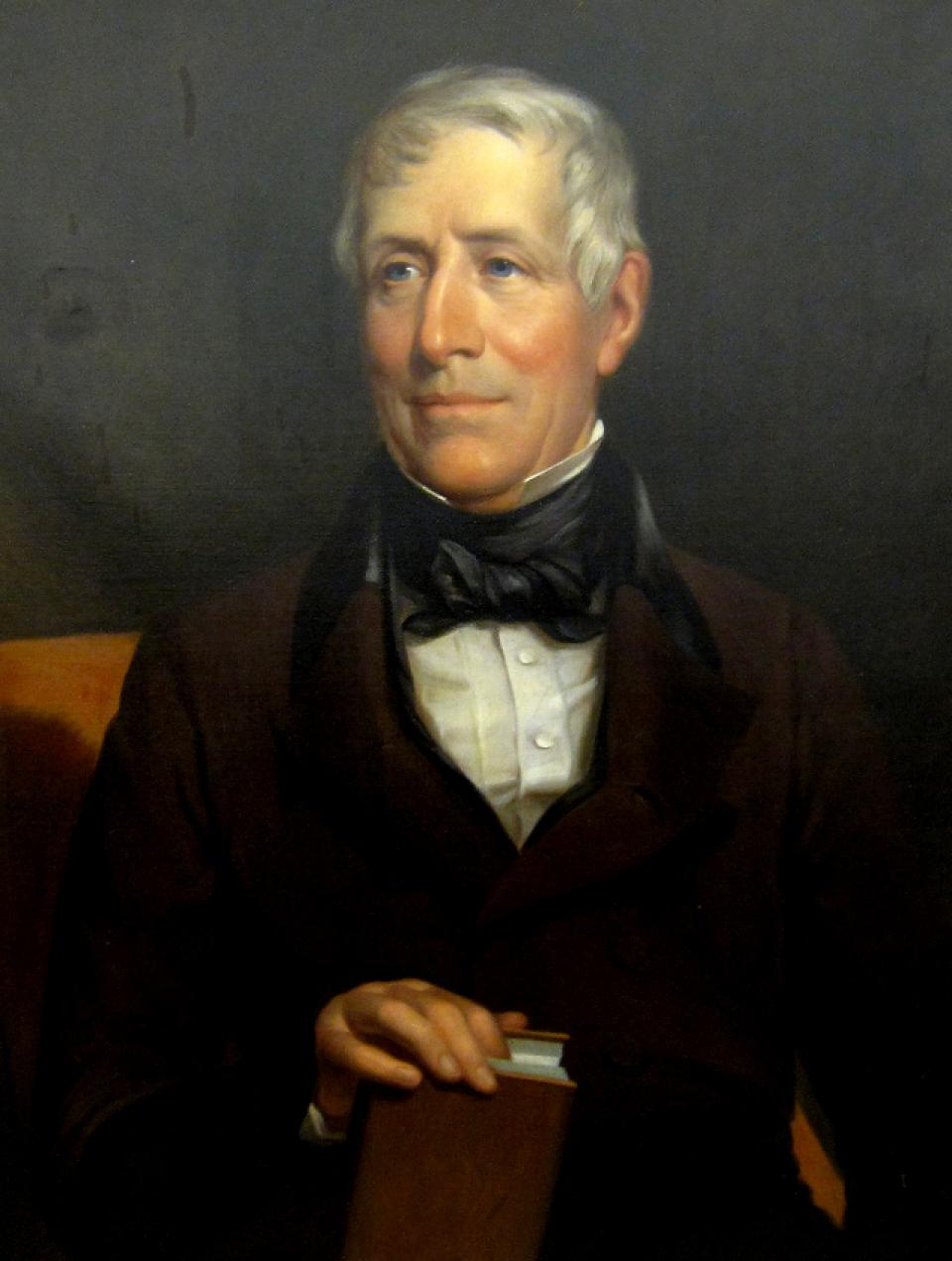
- Born: April 3, 1776; Hoogeveen, Dutch Republic
- Died: May 22, 1854 (aged 78); Meadville, Pennsylvania, U.S.
- Spouse: Rebecca Colhoon (m. 1808)

Harm Jan Huidekoper (April 3, 1776 – May 22, 1854) was a businessman, philanthropist, essayist and lay theologian, a vice president of the American Unitarian Association, and a founder of the Meadville Theological School.

== Early life ==
Huidekoper was born in Hoogeveen, Drenthe province in the Dutch Republic. His parents were Anne Jans Huidekoper and his second wife Gesiena Frederica Wothers. He was educated in Hoogeveen and attended an Institute at Krefeld, Prussia (Germany). After leaving Krefeld, Huidekoper spent time at home and in Amsterdam and then emigrated to America in August 1796.

== Career ==
Huidekoper first settled in the community of Dutch expatriates in Cazenovia, New York and worked there for John Lincklaen, the Holland Land Company agent for that area. Huidekoper then moved to nearby Barneveld, New York and in 1799 became the clerk for Adam Gerard Mappa who also worked for the Holland Land Company. In Barneveld he became acquainted with François Adriaan van der Kemp and his political and religious views. In 1802 Huidekoper transferred to Philadelphia to become the assistant to Paul Busti, Agent General for the Holland Land Company holdings in America.

In 1802 he was sent to Meadville, Pennsylvania, to review the bookkeeping for the Holland Land Company land holdings in western Pennsylvania.

In 1804 the resident agent in Meadville resigned and Huidekoper moved to Meadville to succeed him. The clarification of land ownership rights under Pennsylvania law was an essential early task undertaken by Huidekoper. This included clearing settlers without land titles from Holland Land Company land, a matter that was eventually decided by the U.S. Supreme Court in February 1805 in Huidekoper’s Lessee v. Douglass.

In 1836 Huidekoper purchased the remaining land tracts in western Pennsylvania from the Holland Land Company, approximately 58,300 acres (236 km^{2}). He continued in this business until the end of his life. He died in Meadville in 1854.

== Family ==
Coat of Arms of Harm Jan Huidekoper

Huidekoper married Rebecca Colhoon of Carlisle, Pennsylvania in 1806. They had seven children: Anna Appolina (1807–1808), Frederic Wolthers (1808–1816), Alfred (1810–1892), Edgar (1812–1862), Anna (1814–1897), Frederic (1817–1892), and Elizabeth Gertrude (1819–1908). Huidekoper built an estate named Pomona Hall near Meadville.

His descendants include Henry S. Huidekoper and Cora Huidekoper Clarke

== Unitarianism ==
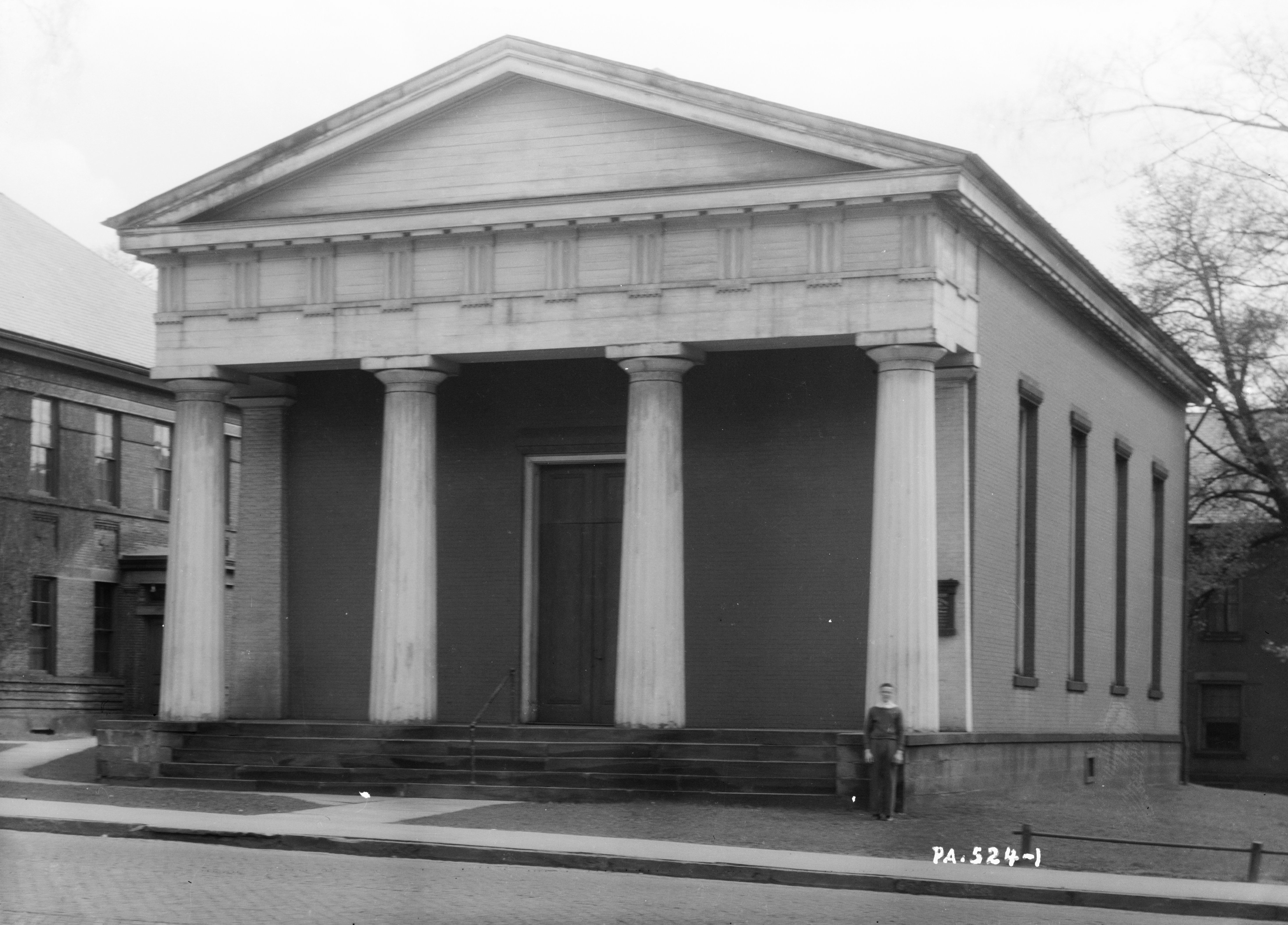
Unitarian Church Meadville

Huidekoper became active in the Unitarian movement and wrote several essays that were distributed nationally. He was a principal backer of the new Unitarian Church built in Meadville in 1835–1836. In 1844 Huidekoper co-founded with his son Frederic Huidekoper the Meadville Seminary school, now part of Meadville Lombard Theological School in Chicago.
