= Holland Land Company =

18th century syndicate of Dutch investors

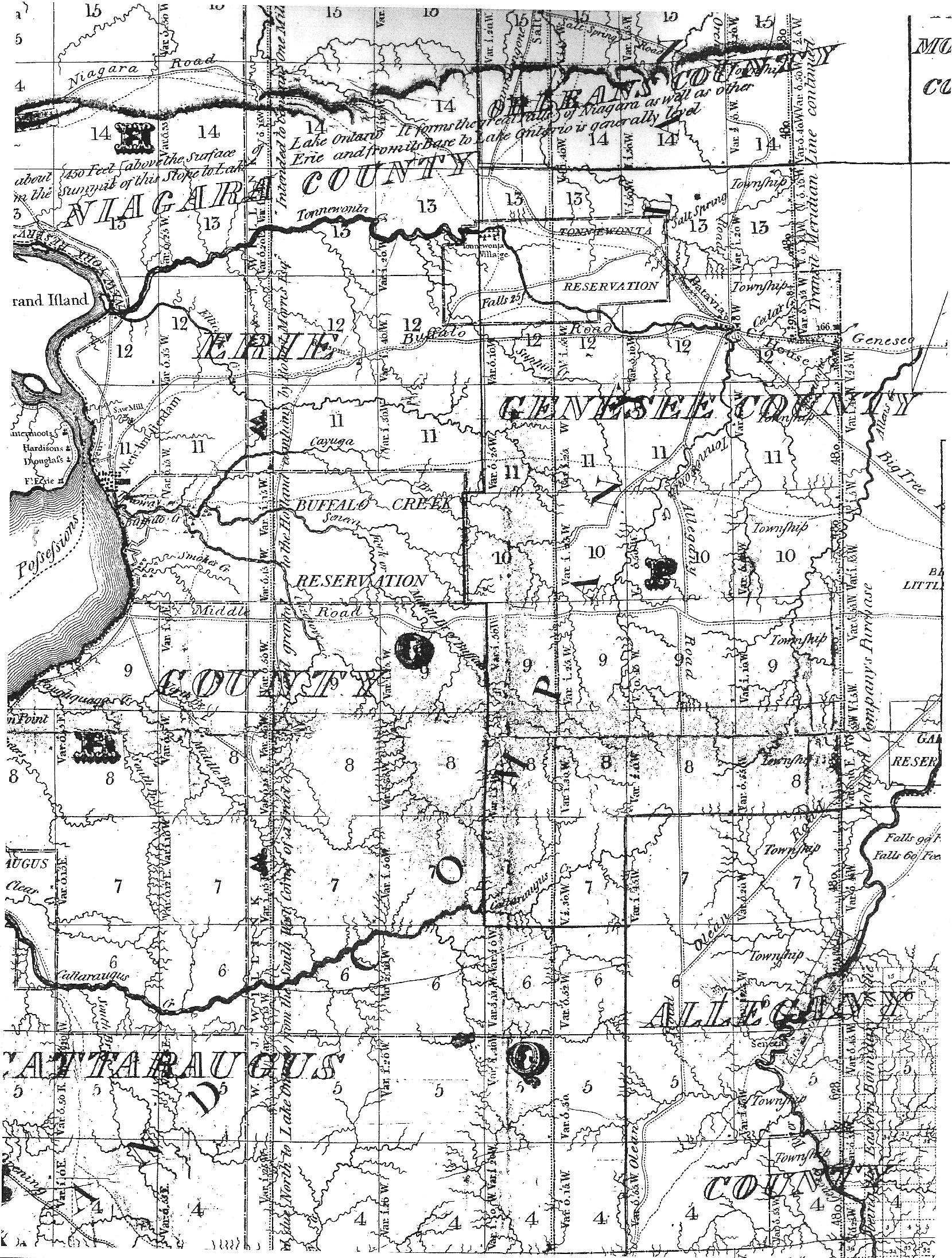
Map of the Holland Purchase (source: Holland Land Company Map - circa. 1821)

The Holland Land Company was an unincorporated syndicate of Dutch investors from Amsterdam, headquartered in Philadelphia, which purchased large tracts of American land for development and speculation. In operation in various iterations between 1789 and 1858, the syndicate's primary acquisition was of the western two-thirds of the Phelps and Gorham Purchase in 1792 and 1793, an area that afterward was known as the Holland Purchase. Additional lands were purchased in northwest Pennsylvania.

Aliens were forbidden from owning land within New York State, except by special acts of the New York State Legislature, so investors placed their funds in the hands of certain trustees who bought the land in central and western New York State. The syndicate hoped to sell the land rapidly at a great profit. Instead, for many years it was were forced to make further investments in their purchase; surveying it, building roads, digging canals, to make it more attractive to settlers. The syndicate influenced state policy in New York to allow foreign ownership of the land, avoid new taxes, and promote the construction of the Erie Canal and government roads on the company lands. It supported Governor Dewitt Clinton's faction in the state government to achieve these goals. The company finished selling its lands in New York in 1839, and in Pennsylvania in 1849, and was liquidated in 1858.

Company lawyer David A. Ogden purchased the pre-emption rights for the remaining Seneca reservation lands from the Holland Land Company in 1810 and established another unincorporated syndicate, the Ogden Land Company. It purchased much of the Seneca lands in the 1820s and 1830s, often fraudulently.

== Land purchases ==
Map of showing Phelps & Gorham's Purchase (including the Mill Yard Tract) The Holland Purchase, and the Morris Reserve.

=== Early purchases ===
Dutch interest in American investments began during the American Revolutionary War (1775–1783). In 1789, four Dutch firms, Pieter Stadnitski and Son, Nicolaas and Jacob Van Staphorst, P. & C. Van Eeghen, and Ten Cate & Vollenhoven, joined and hired Dutch financier Theophile Cazenove as their purchasing agent to engage in land speculation. Cazenove's office, and later the company headquarters, were based in Philadelphia. The four houses soon expanded to six when they were joined by Willem Willink and Rutger Jan Schimmelpenninck in 1792, and established shares for the Holland Land Company in 1795. In 1791, Cazenove purchased 80,000 acres (320 km^{2}) north of the Mohawk River and 120,000 acres (490 km^{2}) in central New York, organized under the Cazenovia Establishment, on behalf of the four houses. In 1792, Cazenove arranged for the purchase of 1,500,000 acres (6,100 km^{2}) in northwestern Pennsylvania on behalf of the six houses.

In addition to land, the Dutch investors bought American funds, including the South Carolina Funded Debt and the Massachusetts Deposit, and shares in the Pennsylvania Population Company. On the advice of Cazenove, they also obtained shares in canal companies in the years 1791–1792, including the Patowmack Canal, James River and Kanawha Canal, Santee Canal, Western Canal and the Connecticut Canal.

=== The Holland Purchase ===
The tract purchased in Western New York was the portion of the Phelps and Gorham Purchase that lay west of the Genesee River. The aboriginal title to the land belonged to the Seneca Indians at the time. During the colonial era, New York and Massachusetts had both claimed pre-emption, the right to purchase the land from the Seneca, based on their colonial charters. In 1786, the two states negotiated an agreement in the Treaty of Hartford that would allow Massachusetts to retain the pre-emption right. Oliver Phelps and Nathaniel Gorham then purchased the pre-emption right from Massachusetts, but failed to extinguish the Indian title to this tract and defaulted on their purchase in 1790. Robert Morris next purchased the pre-emption right from Massachusetts in 1791 for $333,333.34 (about $6.32 million today). Morris was a signatory of the Declaration of Independence and a financier of the American Revolution, and at the time was the richest man in America. His purchase from Massachusetts was for some 3,750,000 acres (15,200 km^{2}), divided into five parcels, which contained all lands west of the Genesee River except for the 185,000 acres (750 km^{2}) of the Mill Yard Tract, which Phelps and Gorham retained along with their other lands east of the Genesee. He was soon pressed by his own debts and sought another purchaser for the land. He kept one parcel of 500,000 acres (2,000 km^{2}) for himself in a tract 12 miles (19 km) wide and running the breadth of Western New York from Lake Ontario to the Pennsylvania border, known as the Morris Reserve. The right for the remaining four parcels, comprising the westernmost 3,250,000 acres (13,200 km^{2}) was then purchased between December 1792 and July 1793 from Morris by the Dutch investors comprising the syndicate, through Cazenove and trustee Herman LeRoy.

=== Treaty of Big Tree ===
Before Morris could give the Holland Land Company title to this land, it was still necessary to extinguish the Indians' title to it. This was achieved at the 1797 Treaty of Big Tree, executed on the Genesee River near modern-day Geneseo, south of Rochester, New York. Representatives of the Holland Land Company, Robert Morris's son Thomas, the Senecas, and a commissioner for the United States named Jeremiah Wadsworth gathered at Big Tree in August, 1797 and negotiations began. Mary Jemison attended as the leader of the Seneca, and proved to be an able negotiator. Chiefs and Sachems present included Red Jacket, Cornplanter, Governor Blacksnake, Farmer's Brother and about 50 others. Red Jacket and Cornplanter spoke strongly against selling the land. They held out for reservations, lands which the Indians would keep for their own use. After much discussion, the Treaty of Big Tree was signed Sept. 15, 1797. The native Indians were to receive $100,000 (about $1.9 million today) for their rights to about 3.75 million acres (15,000 km^{2}), and they reserved about 200,000 acres (809 km^{2}) for themselves.

In 1802, the boundaries of the Cattaraugus Reservation were adjusted and a strip of Seneca lands along the Niagara River was acquired by the company.

== Investors ==
In 1798, the New York Legislature, with the assistance of Aaron Burr, authorized aliens to hold land directly, and the trustees conveyed the Holland Purchase to the real owners. It was transferred to two sets of proprietors, and one of these sets soon divided into two, making three sets of owners altogether. Each set of proprietors owned their tract as "joint tenants" with right of survivorship, which means as proprietors died off, the surviving proprietors took the deceased's share, and that share did not pass by will or inheritance, except in the case of the last survivor.

The first transfer by the trustees was all of the Holland Purchase except 300,000 acres (1,200 km^{2}), which went to Wilhelm Willink, Nicolaas van Staphorst, Pieter van Eeghen, Hendrick Vollenhoven, and Rutger Jan Schimmelpenninck. The 300,000 acre (1,200 km^{2}) remainder was conveyed to Wilhelm Willink, Wilhelm Willink Jr., Jan Willink and Jan Willink Jr. About two years after the first transfers, the proprietors of the large tract reconveyed title to the original five, plus Wilhelm Willink Jr., Jan Willink Jr., Jan Gabriel van Staphorst, Roelof van Staphorst Jr., Cornelius Vollenhoven, Hendrick Seye and Pieter Stadnitski. The members of the Holland Land Company never travelled to America.

== Land sales ==
=== Land surveys ===
In 1795, Joseph Ellicott was hired as the chief surveyor for the company. Beginning in 1798, he formed a surveying team including his brother Benjamin, Augustus Porter, and 130 men. Over the next three years they surveyed the Holland Tract at a total cost of US$70,921.69½ (about $1,345,413 in today's dollars). While surveying the boundaries of the Buffalo Creek Reservation, Porter bent the northwest corner of the reservation so that the Holland Land Company would own the land around the mouth of the creek where the village of Buffalo was to be built.

=== Company agents ===
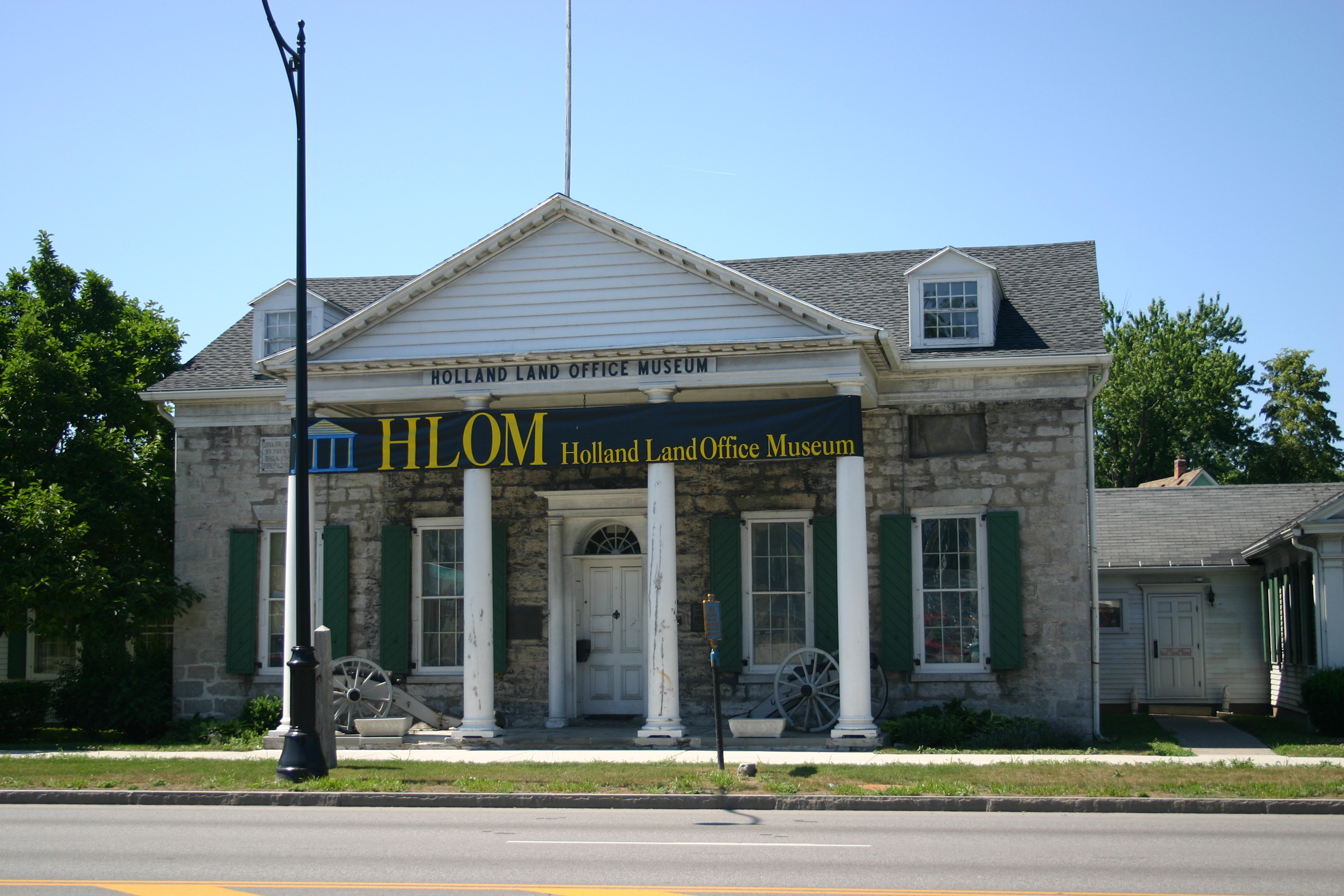
The Holland Land Co. office in Batavia, New York

In 1799, Paul Busti (Paolo Busti) succeeded Cazenove as General Agent. Busti was a native of Milan who had made his career in Amsterdam where he married Elizabeth May, a sister-in-law of one of the syndicate members, Isaac ten Cate. Other agents with Dutch roots included John Lincklaen, Gerrit Boon, Adam Gerard Mappa, and Mr. Busti's assistants Harm Jan Huidekoper and John Jacob Vanderkemp. Vanderkemp succeeded Busti as Agent General after his death in 1824 and served until the liquidation of the Holland Land Companies assets in the 1840s.

Ellicott was then the resident agent in charge of the Holland Tract land sales in 1800. After Ellicott's resignation in 1821, the Holland Tract sales were overseen by Jacob S. Otto from 1821 to 1827, and David E. Evans from 1827 to 1837. David A. Ogden and his brother Thomas Ludlow Ogden were legal advisors to the company.

=== Company operations ===
The Holland Land Company opened a main land office in 1801 in Batavia, New York, which later became the county seat of Genesee County. A second office was opened in Danby, Vermont. Busti also appointed local agents at other offices within different parts of the area. They located subagents in Mayville in 1810, Ellicottville in 1818, Buffalo in 1826, Meadville, Instanter (a small village of German settlers in McKean County, Pennsylvania), two districts in Eastern Alleghany, Lancaster, Cazenovia, and Barneveld. From the very beginning the agents were urged to keep the records in stone fireproof safes or to deposit them with banks.

The company struggled to sell its Pennsylvania lands, which were unsuitable for farming and today remain sparsely populated. The four houses similarly struggled to find buyers in the northern New York tracts, which were sold to Michael Hogan in 1806, and the Cazenovia Establishment, which was sold to John Lincklaen in 1818.

After years of preparation, the first land sale in the Holland tract was made in 1804. Tension between the company and the residents of Western New York began almost immediately due to the structure of the land sales. The Dutch investors had instructed for land to be sold for $2.75 per acre with a down payment of one-quarter to one-third its value, but it soon became apparent to Ellicott and the other agents that these prices were unaffordable to nearly all of the arriving settlers, some of whom were entirely cashless. In the sparsely populated region, eviction was also difficult to carry out once land had been settled on. As a result, conditional sales were made ad hoc by the agents, involving discounted prices, lower down payments, longer mortgages, or labor from the settlers on the company's behalf. Leniency earned the company goodwill with the settlers for many years.

The company worked on several investments to local infrastructure to make the land more profitable and attractive, including roads, irrigation systems, canals, and mills. Free tracts of land were set aside for the construction of private roads, inns, churches, and other structures. In 1802, the company laid out the first street plan for the city of Buffalo. Ellicott recognized that the company lacked the resources to build and maintain roads, and so he lobbied the state legislature for the creation of Genesee County, which initially encompassed all of the Holland Purchase lands, so that it could assume control over local road construction. After succeeding, Ellicott ensured that all of the county's officials would be favorable to the company. Most settlers believed that company and government services were still inadequate, and public campaigns were organized to levy a tax on nonresidents to support government improvements starting in the 1810s. The company lobbied for the construction of the Erie Canal to improve land values further, and Ellicott was appointed to the canal commission in 1816. The company donated 100,000 acres of land for the canal's right of way. In the 1830s, after years of petitions from Western New Yorkers, the New York legislature passed a law taxing debts due to foreign landowners, targeted specifically at the company. The company responded by ending its lenient policies to increase profits. It also began selling its land deeds to local investors, who enforced collections and evictions even more strictly. Events came to a head in 1836 when the Mayville and Batavia offices were both attacked by mobs.

In 1839, the last land in Western New York was sold off to local investors and settlers, and the Batavia office was closed. Land sales in Pennsylvania were concluded in 1849, and in 1856, the Philadelphia headquarters closed. The company was formally dissolved in 1858.

The town of Holland, New York was named after the company.

== Ogden Land Company ==
David Ogden purchased the pre-emption right for the remaining Seneca reservation lands from the Holland Land Company in 1810, and transferred the right to a new syndicate called the Ogden Land Company in 1821, led by Robert Troup, Thomas Ludlow Ogden, and Benjamin W. Rogers. In 1826, the syndicate negotiated a treaty to purchase several reservation lands, including the Caneadea Reservation, Canawagus Reservation, Big Tree Reservation, Squawky Hill Reservation, and portions of the Gardean, Tonawanda, Cattaraugus, and Buffalo Creek Reservations, for $48,216. The treaty was never ratified by the Senate, and in 1896 the Seneca Nation unsuccessfully attempted to recover the land in Seneca Nation of Indians v. Christy. In 1838, after Ogden's death, the company was party to the Second Treaty of Buffalo Creek for all of the remaining Iroquois lands in New York, which was ratified but was also disputed as fraudulent. This land purchase was modified by the Third Treaty of Buffalo Creek in 1842 and Fourth Treaty of Buffalo Creek in 1857. In 1856, agents of the company were successfully sued by Seneca John Blacksmith for forcibly evicting him from his sawmill in Fellows v. Blacksmith.

In 1895, the sole surviving trustee of the Ogden Land Company, Charles Appleby, falsely claimed the company had extinguished the aboriginal title to the Allegany and Cattaraugus Reservations, and possessed clear title to them. He attempted to sell the lands to the United States government for $300,000, and funds were appropriated for the purchase in that year's Indian Appropriations bill. This measure was supported by David Hill in the Senate but opposed in the House of Representatives and ultimately defeated.
