= Paul Busti =

Italian-born American businessman (1749–1824)

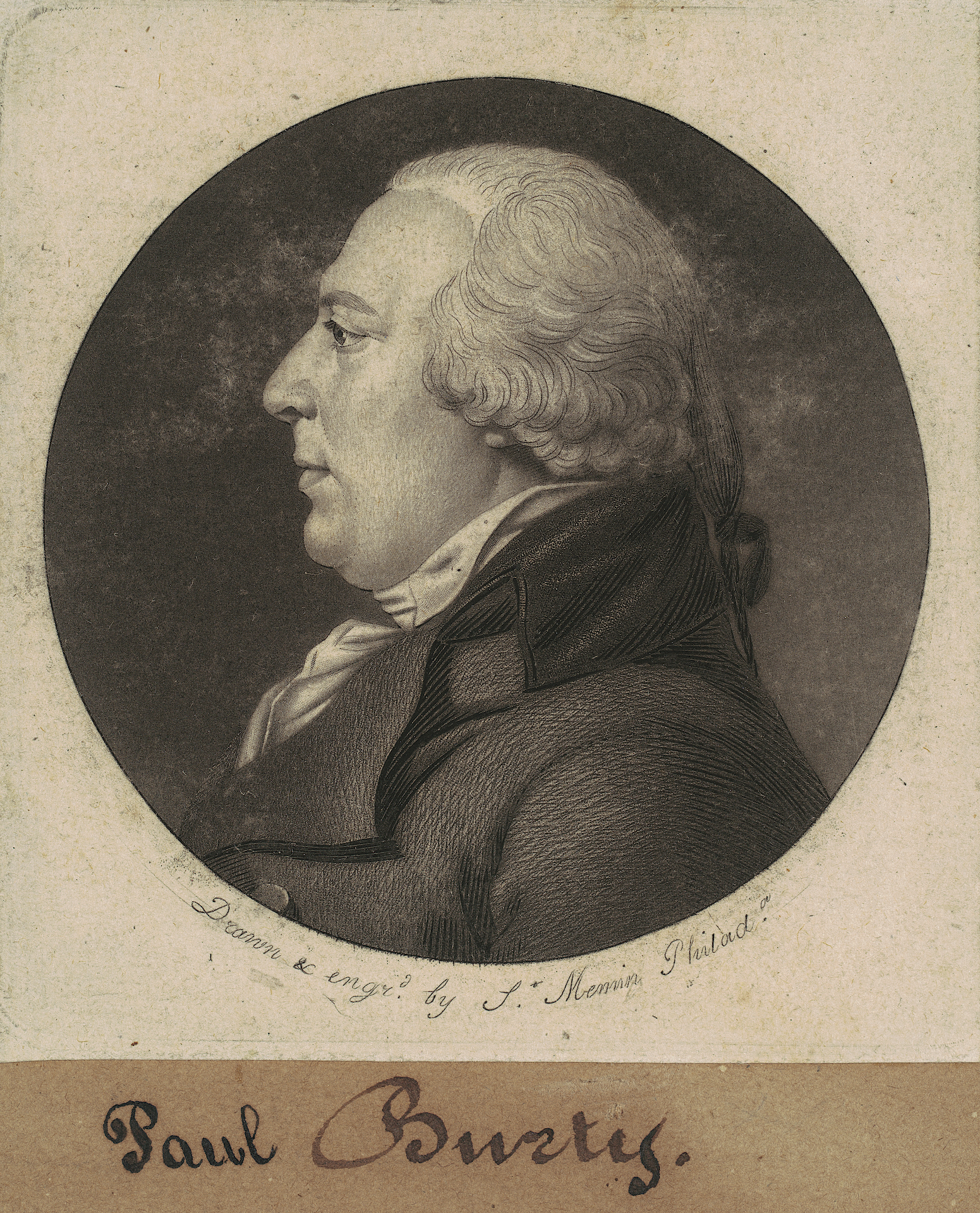
- Born: 8 October 1749; Monza, Lombardy, Italy
- Died: 23 July 1824 (aged 74); Philadelphia, Pennsylvania
- Spouse: Elisabeth May
- Parent(s): Giulio Cesare Busti and Marianna Zappa

Paul Busti (8 October 1749 – 23 July 1824) was the Agent General (chief operating officer) of the Holland Land Company from 1799 until his death in 1824. As administrator of the Holland Land Company, Busti was responsible for the economic, political, and social development of large areas of central and western New York and northwestern Pennsylvania.

Busti was also known as Paulus Busti and Paolo Busti.

== Early life ==
Busti was born in Monza (Italy). He was the son of Giulio Cesare Busti, a Milanese banker, and Marianna Zappa and was baptized Pauolo Ignatio Gerardo Maria Busti. Busti grew up in Milan and received a "liberal education" during the Italian Enlightenment led by Cesare Beccaria, Paolo Frisi and Roger Boscovich and the culture of Il Caffè. Busti spoke and wrote in several languages.

== Career ==
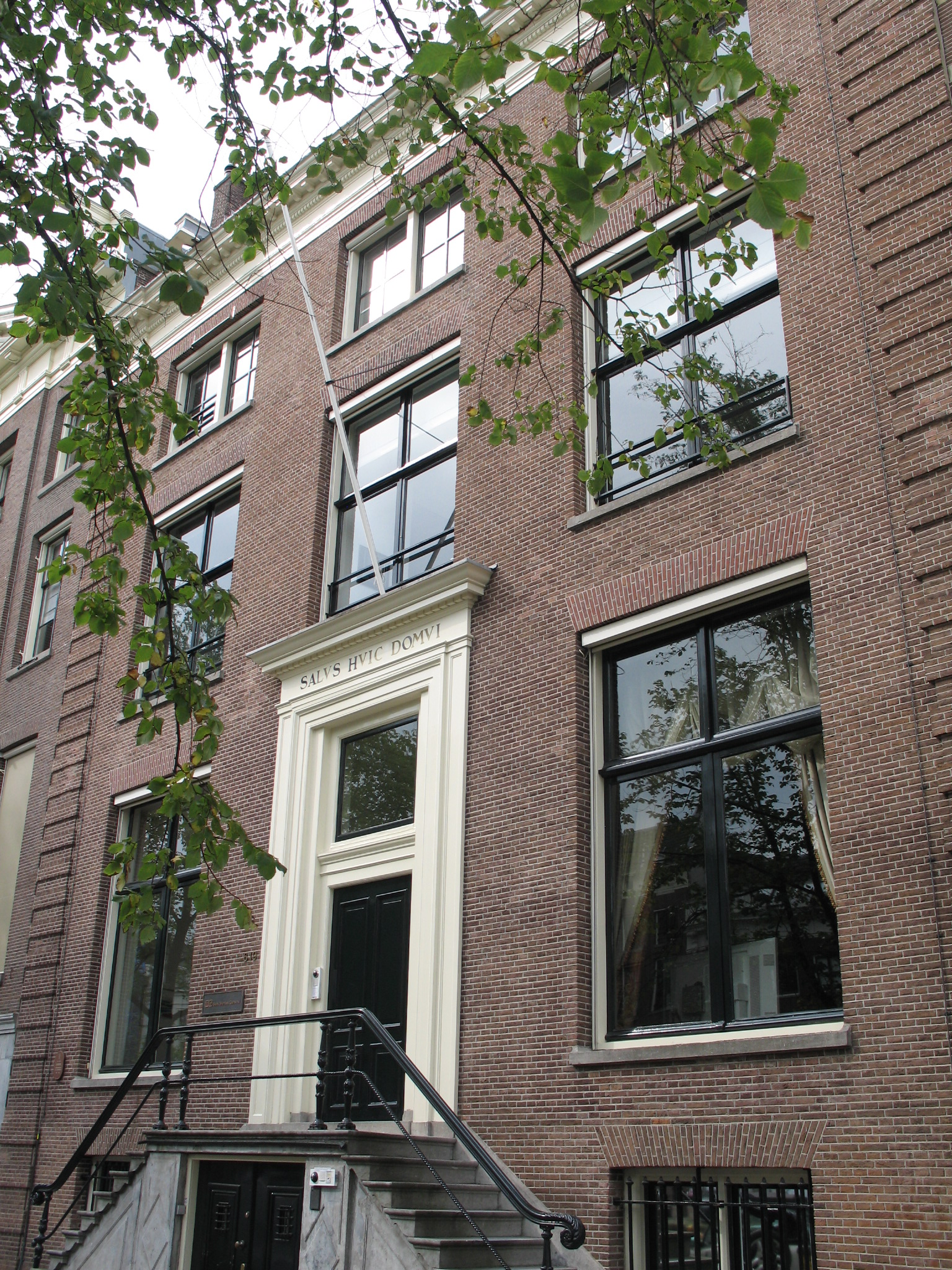
Herengracht 619- Amsterdam

From 1771, he was sent to Amsterdam, working in his uncle's counting house. He lived at Herengracht 455 (Golden Bend) and 619. (In 1796 the Bolongaro Simonetta Company liquidated.) In 1797 he moved to the United States.

Busti was named Agent General of the Holland Land Company following the departure of Theophilus Cazenove in 1799. Busti supervised resident land agents located in Barneveld, New York, Cazenovia, New York, Batavia, New York and Meadville, Pennsylvania. Busti approved the establishment by Joseph Ellicott of the Holland Land Company Office in Batavia, New York, In 1802 Harm Jan Huidekoper transferred to Philadelphia to become his assistant. Busti dealt with Robert Morris (financier), Aaron Burr, John Dunlap and Alexander Hamilton (the treasurer). Busti kept a diary and as a farmer he made notes about improving agriculture, and the weather. Twice Busti visited Western New York during his twenty-four years as leadership. There he met with Francois Adriaan van der Kemp, and John Lincklaen.

== Personal life ==
Busti married Elisabeth May, the daughter of John May, Jr. and Martha Naudin in 1794 in the English Episcopal Church in Amsterdam. The May family were of English origin and her father, uncle and grandfather were shipwrights, contractors, and suppliers for the Admiralty of Amsterdam. The Naudin family were merchants of French descent. Elisabeth's older sister, Martha May, was married to Isaak ten Cate, one of the Holland Land Company investors. Busti was predeceased by his wife in 1822 and died on 23 July 1824 in Philadelphia, Pennsylvania. Both are buried in Christ Church Burial Ground in Philadelphia.

== Legacy ==
The Town of Busti, New York and the hamlet of Busti in Chautauqua County are named after him. There is also a Busti Avenue in Buffalo, New York, and the Paolo Busti Cultural Foundation in Batavia, New York.
