= Antoine Charles Cazenove =

Swiss Consul to the United States for the District of Columbia and the Southern States
- In office July 1822 – 16 October 1852

Personal details
- Born: 8 April 1775 Geneva, Republic of Geneva
- Died: 16 October 1852 (aged 77)
- Spouse: Ann Hogan
- Children: 3

Antoine Charles Cazenove (8 April 1775 – 16 October 1852) (born Antoine Charles de Cazenove) was a Swiss-American businessman and diplomat.

== Biography ==
Antoine Charles Cazenove was born on 8 April 1775 to Paul Cazenove and Jeanne-Elisabeth Martin. His ancestry traced to a Huguenot family of Nîmes, France which upon the declaration of the Edict of Nantes was forced to flee to Geneva, Republic of Geneva. Cazenove attended military school in Colmar but, unsatisfied with soldier livelihood, convinced his father to let him drop out one year before completing his education and join banking relatives in London (his classmates who graduated later served as Louis XVI's guards during the 10 August Revolution in France). After three years of work he returned to Geneva to visit his parents. However, conflict spilled over from the French Revolution the city was briefly seized by Jacobins. Cazenove, his father, and his older brother were imprisoned with other local aristocrats in a granary. The brothers were brought to trial but were acquitted of any wrongdoing and released.

Following the release of his father, Cazenove and his family traveled through Germany to Hamburg, where they took a ship to Britain, and then to Philadelphia, the United States, arriving in November 1794. Cazenove's family later went back to France. He married a woman he met in Philadelphia, Ann Hogan, and eventually had two sons and a daughter with her in America. Originally planning to return to Geneva, Cazenove arranged for all of his children to have citizenship of the city. He partnered with Albert Gallatin in establishing a glassworks plant in Uniontown, Pennsylvania (the first in the United States) and later erected several mills west of the Allegheny Mountains. John Jacob Astor offered him a job assisting in his burgeoning fur trade business, but he declined.

In 1799 Cazenove moved to Alexandria, Virginia. The following year he was hired as an agent by the E. I. du Pont de Nemours and Company and purchased several warehouses in the area on its behalf. He later founded A.C. Cazenove & Company and served as director of the Bank of Alexandria. By 1822, Cazenove had established himself as a successful wine and tobacco merchant in the city. In July, he was appointed by the Swiss Federal Diet to be one of the two first Swiss consuls in the United States. He performed his consular duties alongside his regular business activities in an honorary capacity until 1852, with his later service containing more formal diplomatic functions. He also performed diplomatic duties for some of the smaller states of the German Confederation, such as the Grand Duchy of Mecklenburg.
