= François Adriaan van der Kemp =

Dutch politician and minister (1752–1829)

François Adriaan van der Kemp or Francis Adrian Vanderkemp (4 May 1752 in Kampen – 1829 in Barneveld, New York) was one of the Dutch radical leaders of the Patriots, a minister and publicist who gave the Patriot movement a Christian tint in his blazing speeches. Having been a promising student in Groningen, Franeker and Amsterdam, he led the local militia (exercitiegenootschap) in Wijk bij Duurstede and ended up in captivity. Van der Kemp was released on 9 December 1787 for a ransom of 45,000 guilder and emigrated to the U.S.A.

== Life ==
Coat of Arms of François Adriaan van der Kemp

Adriaan was the son of an army officer, his mother was related to Willem Jacob 's Gravesande, a scientist. He grew up in Zutphen and Zwolle, but in 1766 the family moved to 's-Hertogenbosch. Adriaan studied at the local grammar school and moved to the University of Groningen to study Oriental languages and botany under Petrus Camper. Van der Kemp was offered a role as a civil servant in Elmina, now in Ghana, but did not go. Instead he went over to the Mennonites and studied theology in Amsterdam with Abraham Staal and Wybo Fijnje. Van der Kemp refused an appointment in Goes and Makkum, but accepted one at Westzaan.

In 1775 he moved to Leiden. From the pulpit Van der Kemp proclaimed:

In America the Sun of Salvation has risen, which will also cast its rays upon us if we so wish: only America can teach us how to counter the degeneration of the national character, to curb the corruption of morals, to ward off bribery, to suffocate the seeds of tyranny and to restore to health our dying freedom. The supreme Being has ordained that America shall be Holland's last preacher of repentance.

It is said Van der Kemp was the author or ghostwriter of the "libel" "To the People of the Netherlands". Simon Schama notes he was the distributor of the pamphlet. Van der Kemp wrote a series of anti-bailiff or droste pamphlets for Joan Derk van der Capellen tot den Pol under different pseudonyms. Van der Kemp and van der Capellen argued that these feudal rights were arbitrarily applied and even unlawful, thus bringing them into conflict with the drosten and the Prince of Orange, who derived the rights of his noble position from such things.

In 1782, he married Reinira Engelbartha Johanna Vos, a daughter of a mayor of Nijmegen. They were the parents of three children: John Jacob Vanderkemp (1783-1855), Cuneira Englebertha Vanderkemp (1785–1865) and Peter A. A. T. Vanderkemp (1789–1857).

In 1783 Van der Kemp moved to Wijk bij Duurstede and became the leader of the local patriots.

The arrest of Princess Wilhelmina of Prussia at the end of June 1787 demanded a response, and so Van der Kemp and Adriaan de Nijs were taken prisoner on 5 July, near Wijk bij Duurstede by a regiment of soldiers from Baden-Durlach and taken to Amersfoort. After his release he emigrated to America. In his baggage was a portrait of Van der Capellen. Van der Kemp published Van der Capellen's collected works in six parts and also contained, next to all Van der Capellen's reasonings, official documents that had not been intended for actual publication.

=== Van der Kemp as immigrant ===
In 1788 Van der Kemp arrived in New York. He bought a farm in Ulster County, New York in 1789, not far from Kingston and from 1777 the capital of New York. He had a house, a shed, a chicken coop, and a few slaves". In 1795, he was the founder of the Agricultural Society for the Western District of New York. Van der Kemp was linked to and visited in Kempwick by various Founding Fathers: John Adams, with whom he had an extensive and fascinating correspondence, Thomas Jefferson, George Washington, Benjamin Franklin and Alexander Hamilton. Mrs DeWitt Clinton, Hamilton and Tappan were all able to speak Dutch with his wife. He shared George Washington's interest in scientific agriculture after a visit to Mount Vernon. Van der Kemp withdrew from political life and threw himself into a new project at 'Nieuw Rotterdam', now called Constantia, in Oswego County.

Constantia had a fantastic location and a fine nature, and there was sufficient game for hunting and fish in the lake. Also Marc Isambard Brunel lived in the neighborhood. However, the bears and Native Americans were never far away, and his friend Adam Gerard Mappa lived at a day's travel away. Van der Kemp moved his family to Barneveld, now called Trenton. His house in Constantia was converted into a school. The Holland Land Company, that had taken into its service Gerrit Boon from Rotterdam, had meanwhile set up a proper village, planted ahorns and had a sugar mill built.

On the national scene, Van der Kemp's opinions influenced many of the great leaders of America. John Adams credited him with a "vast view of civilization" and respected his advice. His warm friendship with John and Abigail Adams endured till their deaths, and John Quincy Adams continued the relationship.

He persuaded Thomas Jefferson to anonymously publish his religious work a "Syllabus of an estimate of the doctrines of Jesus compared with those of others". He was elected a member of the American Philosophical Society in 1805 and a Fellow of the American Academy of Arts and Sciences in 1807. Van der Kemp and Mappa wrote in an early stage (1807?) about digging a canal between Albany and Buffalo, the work on the Erie Canal started in 1817. The state received 100,000 acres (400 km^{2}) from Holland Land Company.

The governor of the state of New York, Dewitt Clinton, named him the most scholarly man in the U.S.A. In 1820 he received an honorary degree from Harvard University, and was elected a member of the American Antiquarian Society in 1822. Van der Kemp started to translate the 17th century records in English, but his translation in the New York State Library went up in smoke in 1911. Van der Kemp began to write his autobiography, but died of cholera on September 7, 1829 at the age 77. Harvard University in Cambridge, Massachusetts received his library.
