= New York State Route 28B =

Former highway in New York

New York State Route 28B
- Map of northeastern Oneida County and vicinity with NY 28B highlighted in red, and modern NY 920V backed in blue

Route information
- Auxiliary route of NY 28
- Maintained by NYSDPW
- Length: 2.79 mi (4.49 km)
- Existed: April 1935–mid-1960s

Major junctions
- South end: NY 287 in Prospect
- North end: NY 12 / NY 28 in Remsen

Location
- Country: United States
- State: New York
- Counties: Oneida

Highway system
- New York Highways; Interstate; US; State; Reference; Parkways
← NY 28A	→ NY 28N

New York State Route 28B (NY 28B) was a state highway in Oneida County, New York, in the United States. The route served as a connector between NY 287 (now NY 365) in the village of Prospect and NY 12 and NY 28 in the village of Remsen. It was assigned in 1935 and removed in the mid-1960s, at which time most of the route became New York State Route 920V, an unsigned reference route. The alignment of NY 28B was originally part of legislative Route 26 and later Route 25 in the early 20th century.

== Route description ==
NY 28B began at an intersection with NY 287 (now mostly part of NY 365) at Church Street in the village of Prospect. The route headed to the northwest, following State Street through the northern portion of the village. At the northern village line, the amount of development along the route decreased substantially as it proceeded through the town of Trenton as Prospect Road. NY 28B continued northwest for 1 mile (1.6 km) on a linear northwesterly routing through a rural section of Trenton to the northern town line, where it crossed into the town of Remsen. The route continued on this path for another 0.25 miles (0.40 km) before turning towards the west and paralleling the town line into the village of Remsen.

Within Remsen, NY 28B became known as Prospect Street as it headed westward for three blocks through the residential southeastern part of the village. In the last of the three, the route crossed over Cincinnati Creek just before intersecting Main Street. While Prospect Street ended here, NY 28B turned south onto Main Street, following it for two blocks to a junction with Steuben Street. Here, NY 28B turned west, passing through a slightly more rural area as it approached the divided highway carrying NY 12 and NY 28 around the western edge of the village. NY 28B ended upon meeting the arterial at the western village line.

== History ==
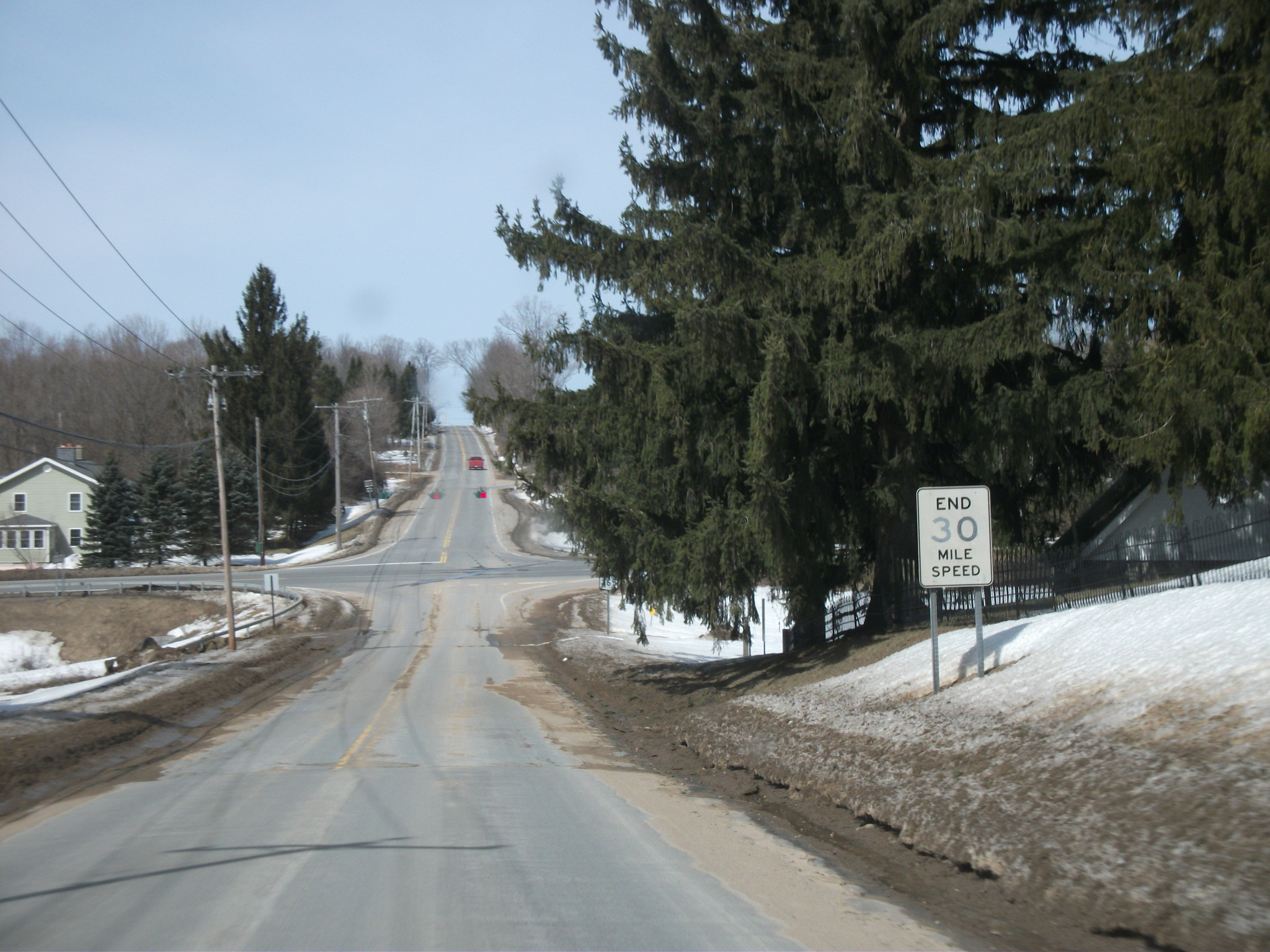
Approaching NY 365 on State Street (former NY 28B) northbound in Prospect. NY 920V, NY 28B's successor, begins at the junction.

In 1908, the New York State Legislature created Route 26, an unsigned legislative route extending from Little Falls to Remsen via Dolgeville, Salisbury, and Prospect. In Remsen, Route 26 ended at Route 25, which followed the modern NY 12 corridor between Barneveld and Remsen. By 1920, Route 26 was reconfigured to run directly from Barneveld to Little Falls while the portion of former Route 26 between Prospect and Remsen became part of a realigned Route 25. When the first set of posted routes in New York were assigned in 1924, the Barneveld–Remsen portion of legislative Route 25 was bypassed by NY 12, which was assigned to Route 25's original, direct alignment between the two villages instead. The portion of legislative Route 25 between Barneveld and Prospect was designated as part of NY 287 in the 1930 renumbering of state highways in New York.

The section of legislative Route 25 from Prospect to Remsen was finally assigned a posted designation in April 1935 when it became part of NY 28B, an alternate route of NY 28 that extended west along NY 287 to Barneveld. At the time, NY 12 and NY 28 followed Mappa Avenue, Old State Road, and Main Street between Barneveld and Remsen while NY 287 and NY 28B were routed on Boon Street, Parker Hollow Road, and Church Street from Barneveld to Prospect. The overlap with NY 287 was eliminated in the early 1950s after NY 28B was truncated to begin in Prospect.

By 1954, NY 12 and NY 28 were shifted westward onto a new bypass around the village of Remsen. NY 28B was extended southward along NY 12 and NY 28's former alignment on Main Street and westward on Steuben Street to meet the new highway. The NY 28B designation was eliminated in the mid-1960s and replaced with NY 920V, an unsigned reference route. Around the same time, NY 287 was realigned onto the bypass that now carries NY 365 around the northern fringe of the village of Prospect, truncating NY 920V to its current length.

== Major intersections ==
The entire route was in Oneida County.

Location	mi	km	Destinations	Notes
Prospect	0.00	0.00	NY 287	Southern terminus
Village of Remsen	2.79	4.49	NY 12 / NY 28	Northern terminus
1.000 mi = 1.609 km; 1.000 km = 0.621 mi
