= Gerrit Boon =

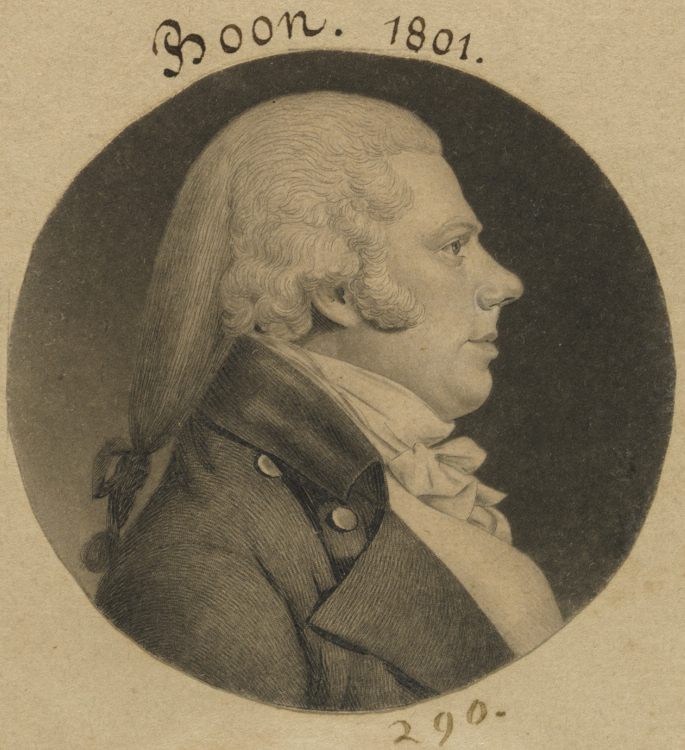

Gerrit Boon (May 15, 1768 in Delft – December 2, 1821 in Gouda) was the son of a Lutheran minister Johan Michiel Boon. His father studied in Helmstedt and moved in 1752 from Amersfoort to Delft and in 1774 to Rotterdam. Gerrit Boon became a sugar refinerer in the city, working for his brother-in-law. He went to the United States in 1790 where he met with John Lincklaen.

In 1792, he bought 30,000 acres (120 km^{2}) near the West Canada Creek. Then he moved to a cabin near Cincinnati and Steuben Creek. Boon believed that harvesting maple syrup could be a year-round activity, so slavery on the sugar plantations could be avoided. In 1794, he gave up the sugar refinery.

Boon worked to develop company lands in New York, first settling in the town of Trenton, New York, where he founded the village now known as Barneveld. Also the Village of Boonville and the Town of Boonville in Oneida County, New York are named after him. He had a budget of $30,000 ($569,118 in 2025 dollars) to hire carpenters, masons and other workmen to create a village for the affluent. Boon's efforts were unsuccessful due in part to incomplete knowledge of the region and bad luck. He built a dam and a mill that were washed away by flood waters in 1797.

In 1798, Boon returned to Holland. His assistant Adam Gerard Mappa took over as the agent of the Holland Land Company and lived in his house until 1809, today called Mappa Hall in Barneveld, New York. In 1804 he married Debora Aeneae, the daughter of an Amsterdam professor in mathematics. In 1813 the couple divorced in Amsterdam, living at Singel (Amsterdam). Boon left Holland and moved to Heeswijk, North Brabant, but died with small debts at the local shops, and wine dealers in Gouda.
