= Mapah =

Mapah may refer to:

- Ha-Mapah (Hebrew: "the tablecloth"), a commentary on the Shulchan Aruch by Moses Isserles
- The Mapah, title of the French mystic Simon Ganneau (1805-1851)

== See also ==
- Mapa (disambiguation)
- Mappa (disambiguation)
