= Mappa =

Mappa may refer to:

- Mappa (genus), a large genus of Old World tropical trees
- MAPPA, a Japanese animation studio
- Mappa Hall, a historic home in Oneida County, New York, owned by Adam Gerard Mappa a Dutch patriot
- Mappa mundi, Medieval European maps of the world
- Multi-Agency Public Protection Arrangement, arrangements in England and Wales for the management of sexual and violent offenders
- Mappa (Roman), the flag used by Roman consuls to start the horse races at the Ancient Roman hippodrome

== See also ==
- Mapa (disambiguation)
