= Bill Patton =

Bill Patton may refer to:

- Bill Patton (baseball) (1912–1986)
- Bill Patton (actor) (1894–1951)

== See also ==
- William Patton (disambiguation)
- Bill Patten (disambiguation)
