= Mapa =

Mapa or MAPA may refer to:

== People ==
- Alec Mapa (born 1965), American actor, comedian and writer
- Dennis Mapa (born 1969), Filipino economist and statistician
- Jao Mapa (born 1976), Filipino actor
- Placido Mapa Jr. (born 1932), Filipino businessman, economist, and government official
- Suraj Mapa (born 1980), Sri Lankan actor
- Victorino Mapa (1855–1927), Filipino chief justice and government official

== Other uses ==
- "Mapa" (song), a 2021 song by SB19
- Mexican American Political Association
- Mapa (publisher), an Israeli subsidiary of Ituran
- Mapa Group, a Turkish conglomerate
- Mapa, a company producing latex gloves that merged with Hutchinson SA in 1973
- Most Affected People and Areas, a climate justice concept
- Mapa (girl group), a Japanese girl group

== See also ==
- Mappa (disambiguation)
- Mapah (disambiguation)
