= Mary Drake =

Mary Drake may refer to:

- Mary E. Drake, American Congregational church minister and Home Missionary worker
- Molly Drake, also known as Mary Drake, English poet and musician
- Mary Drake (Pretty Little Liars), a TV character
