= Remsen, New York (disambiguation) =

Remsen, New York is the name of two locations in Oneida County, New York, United States:

- Remsen (village), New York
- Remsen (town), New York
