= Central Presbyterian Church (Manhattan) =

Church in Manhattan, New York

- Central Presbyterian Church of New York City
- The church in August 2026

- Location within Manhattan
- 40°45′56.5″N 73°58′01.9″W
- Location: 593 Park Avenue; New York, New York
- Country: United States
- Denomination: Evangelical Presbyterian Church (United States)
- Website: centralchurchnyc.org

History
- Former name: Park Avenue Baptist Church
- Founded: 8 January 1821
- Founder: William Patton
- Events: First service in current building, September 22, 1929

Architecture
- Architect(s): Henry C. Pelton, Allen & Collens
- Style: neo-Gothic
- Completed: 1922 as Park Avenue Baptist Church

Specifications
- Capacity: 700

Clergy
- Pastor: Jason Harris

Central Presbyterian Church is a historic congregation on the Upper East Side of Manhattan in New York City, founded by pastor and abolitionist William Patton in 1821. It is a member of the Evangelical Presbyterian Church, and it worships in a Gothic Revival structure completed in 1922 that was originally commissioned and largely funded by John D. Rockefeller Jr. as Park Avenue Baptist Church.

The church currently hosts Sunday services at 9:30am, 11:00am, and 5:00pm in addition to lectures, seminars, and chamber music concerts.

== History ==
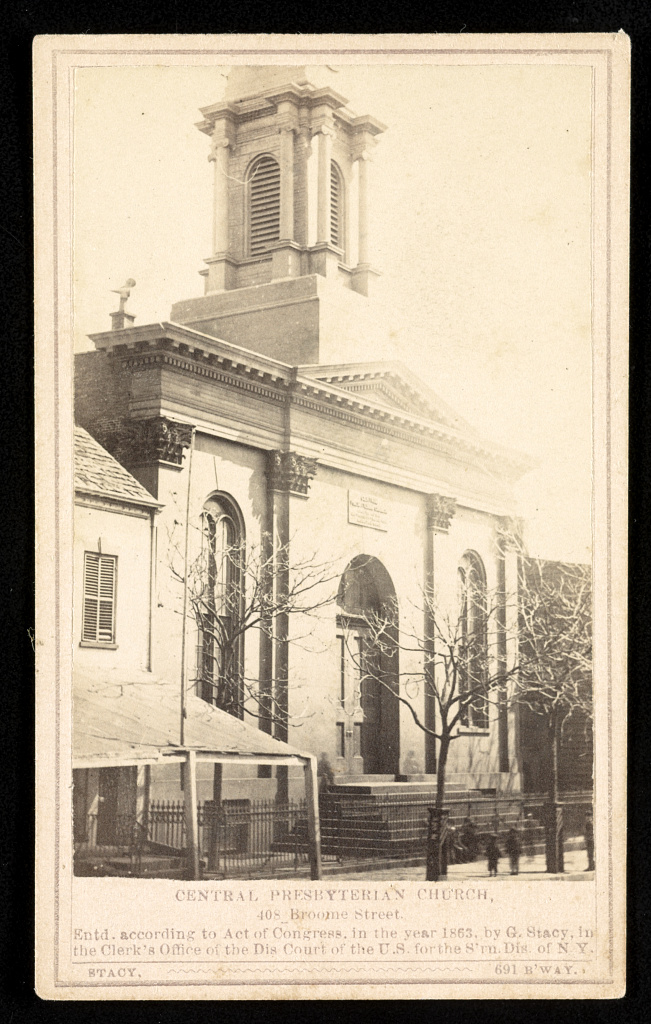
Central Church at Broome Street

=== Origin ===
In March 1820, the church that would eventually become Central Presbyterian Church was a small church plant started by William Patton. The church held gatherings in a schoolroom on Mulberry Street at Patton's expense. In January 1821, the church was officially founded by Patton. He was only 22 years old at the time of the establishment of the church. In February 1821, the church was incorporated as a religious corporation in the state of New York.

=== Growth ===
In the Central's first year, the congregation grew considerably and acquired their first church building, on the north side of Broome Street. The building opened for weekly services in May 1822 with Patton distinguished as Central's first pastor. Despite such humble beginnings, the church quickly become influential in both New York City and the world. William Patton was very involved in many different engagements during his time as pastor, such as founding Union Theological Seminary and publishing acclaimed articles, including those arguing against slavery as a staunch abolitionist. Patton was succeeded by Rev. Dr. William Adams, a pastor known for his forceability and eloquence. The church grew rapidly during Adams' pastoral leadership; however, Central's Broome Street location had found itself in a vicinity that had become over-saturated with businesses.

In 1869, a site was purchased for the congregation on 57th Street between Broadway and Seventh Avenue, and when Fifth Avenue Presbyterian Church decided to move from Fifth Avenue and 19th Street to its present location on 55th Street, they donated their 19th Street edifice to Central Church. Moved brick by brick and pew by pew to its new location, the old Fifth Avenue structure became Central's new home.

During the pastorate of the Rev. Dr. Milton Merle-Smith, Central opened missions in Hyden, Kentucky in 1894 and Huaiyuan County, Anhui Province, China in 1901. Charles Ives was the organist from 1900-1902. In December 1904, The Big Brothers of New York, Inc. found its starts at a men's club at Central Presbyterian Church.

In 1915, Madison Avenue Reformed Church (on the northeast corner of Madison Avenue and 57th Street) bought Central Church (the old Fifth Avenue edifice). In exchange, Central bought the Madison Avenue structure, which was closer to where many of its members were then living on the Upper East Side. A long and distinguished pastorate of 31 years in the person of the Rev. Dr. Wilton Merle-Smith ended with his retirement in 1920 and his death on October 3, 1923, concluding a significant era in the church's history.

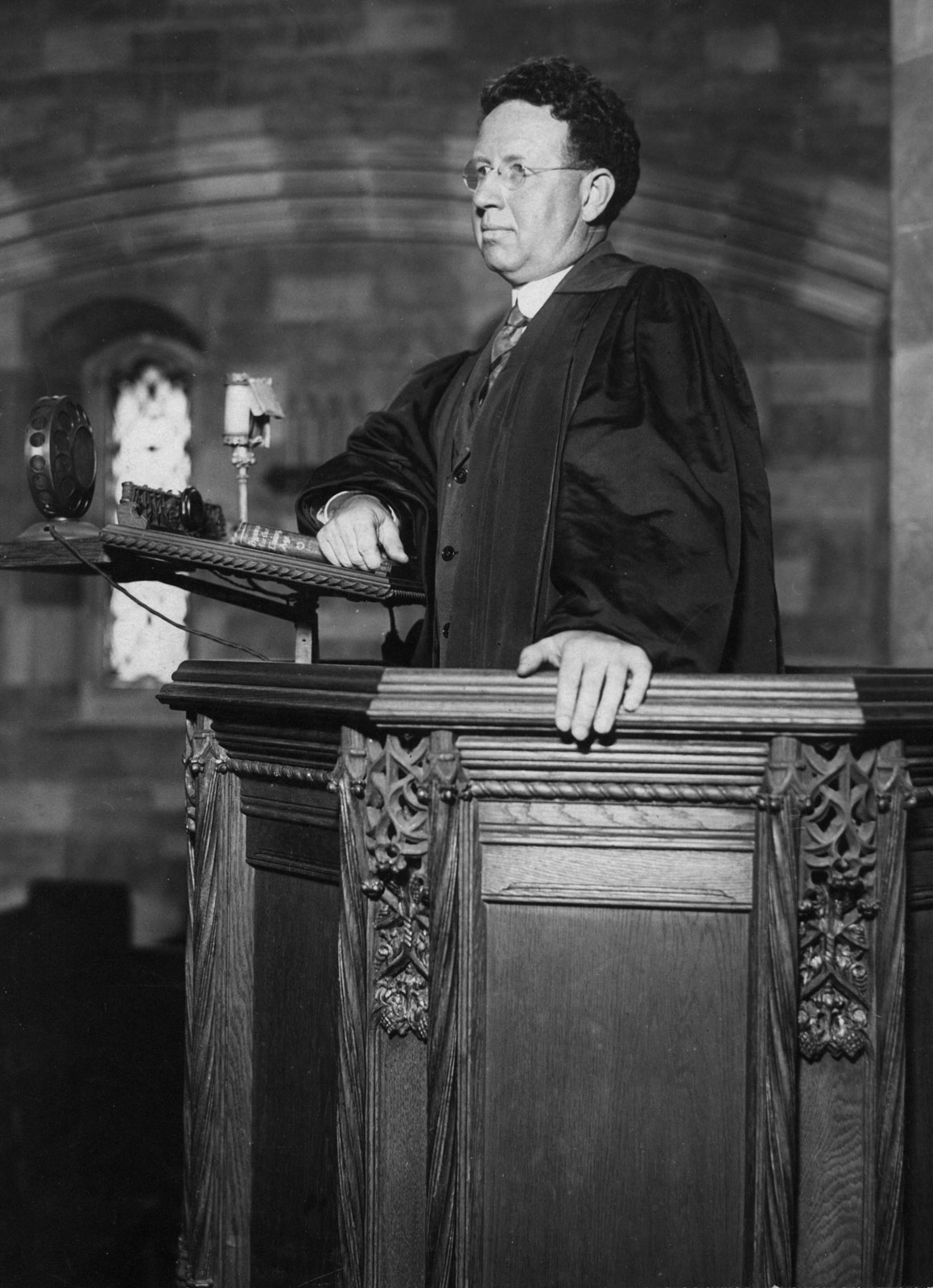
Harry Emerson Fosdick in the pulpit of Park Avenue Baptist

In 1926, Central purchased the Park Avenue Baptist building as Harry Emerson Fosdick's liberalist preaching was drawing such large crowds that the Park Avenue Baptist congregation needed to move to a larger space, which prompted the construction of Riverside Church. In the interim before Riverside finished construction, Central met at the Plaza Hotel and, after closing on the purchase, held its first service in its new home at 593 Park Avenue on Sunday, September 22, 1929, shortly before the October 1929 stock market crash.

Musica Sacra was founded in 1964 at Central under the music directorship of Richard Westenburg. In the 1970s, the church was facing budgetary problems and declining membership and was sold to the Asia Society in 1975 to be demolished for a new building to house a $10 million collection of Asian art given to the institution by John D. Rockefeller III. However, the transaction did not go forward due to a court proceeding initiated by certain members of Central.

=== Renewal ===
After a period of drastic decline in the church, dynamic renewal began to take place in 2006. A group of dedicated Christians from around the greater New York City area began attending Central in an attempt to revitalize the church. The Rev. Dr. J. Howard Edington was called as "Preacher in Residence" of Central Presbyterian Church in 2008, and the Rev. Dr. Douglas Webster was called as pastor in 2010, stabilizing and repositioning the church for the future. As an extension of the revitalization effort, the Rev. Jason Harris joined Central as Director of Church Renewal through a partnership with the New City Commons foundation in August 2011, under whose leadership the church entered a period of significant growth and renewal reaching average weekly attendance of over 650 people. In June 2013, Central joined and affiliated with the EPC. The congregation also called Harris to serve as the Senior Pastor, and he was installed to the position on April 27, 2014.

In 2018, Central launched the public phase of its campaign to restore the facade of the building, having retained Walter B. Melvin Architects since 2011 to create a plan for the restoration and renewal of the building.

=== Locations ===
In response to rapid demographic changes in New York City, Central Presbyterian Church moved a number of times to different brick and mortar locations.

- Broome Street (1821-1866)
- 7th Avenue (1876-1915)
- Madison Avenue (1915-1927)
- Park Avenue (1929–Present)

== Architecture ==
Central's current building was originally Park Avenue Baptist Church, which was designed by Henry C. Pelton, associated with Allen & Collens, and mostly financed by John D. Rockefeller Sr. & Jr. Given the limited size of the lot (100' x 80'), the neo-Gothic church building is seven stories high with classrooms, offices, studies, and other rooms above the main sanctuary with a gym (originally another auditorium) below, although the exterior features are arranged so that the building appears to be one large sanctuary, hiding the upper floors. The exterior walls are constructed out of West Townsend granite with trim of variegated Indiana limestone.

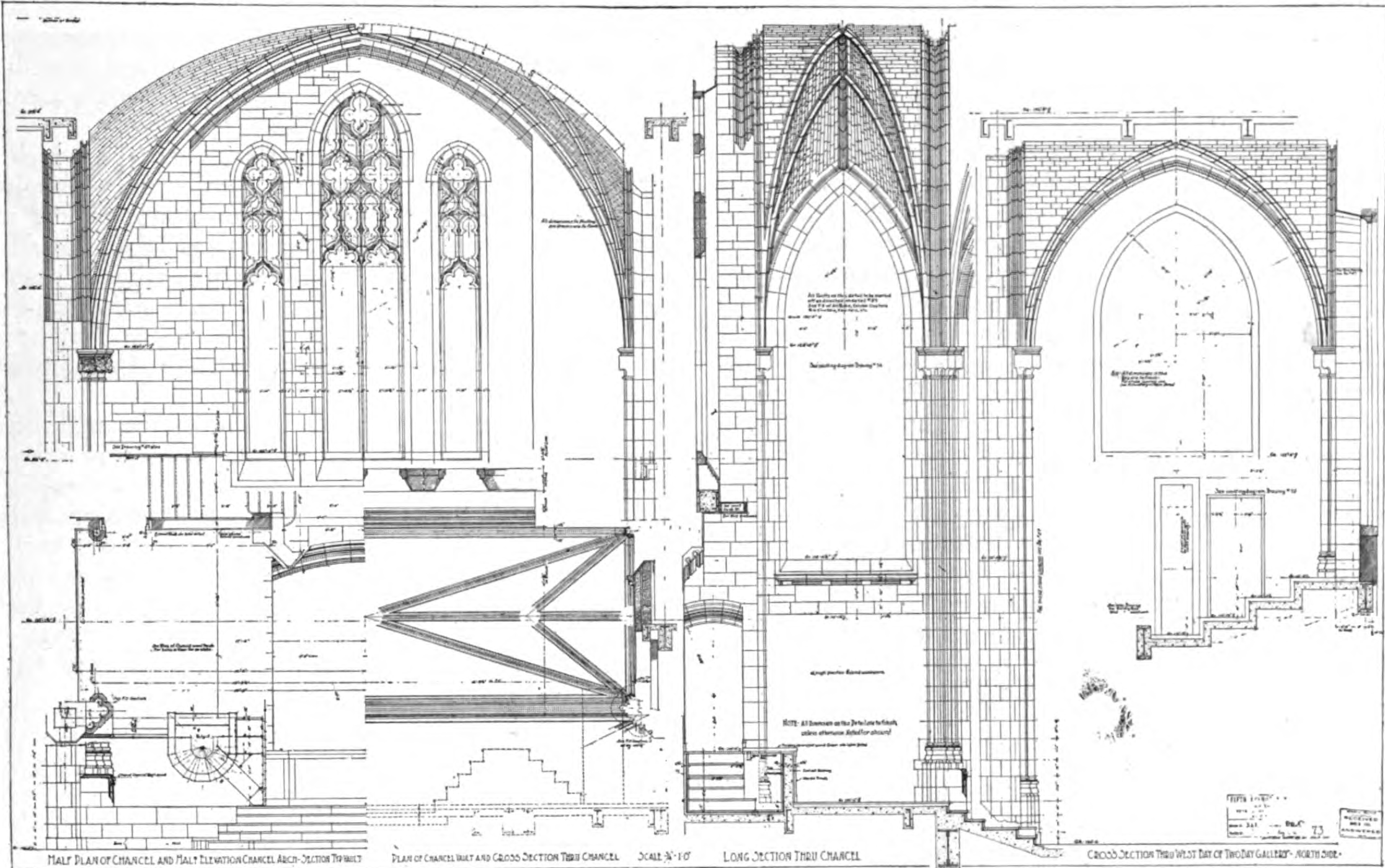
Architectural plan of Park Avenue Baptist Church

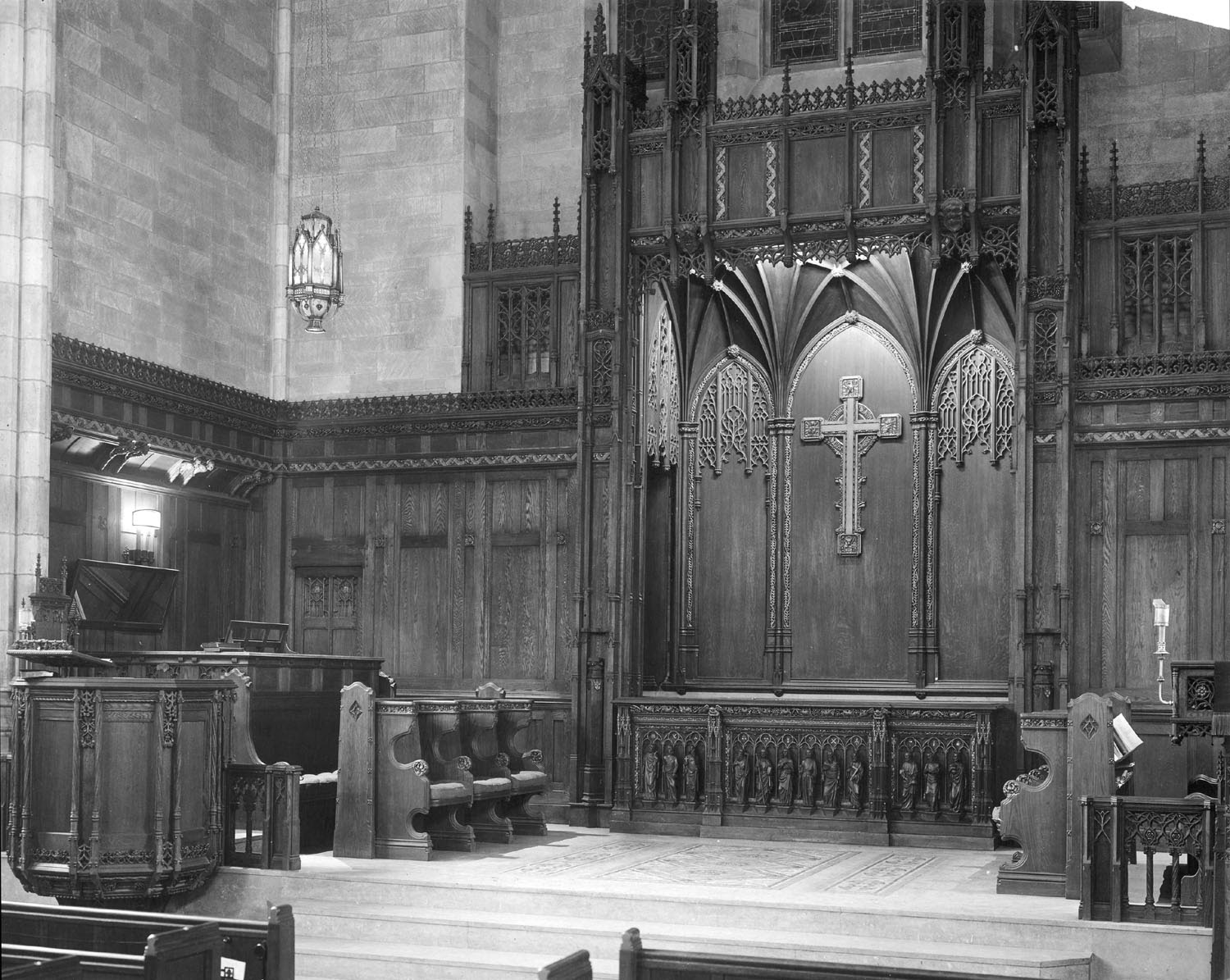
Original chancel layout of Park Avenue Baptist, with baptistery and screen in front

The main sanctuary has a vaulted ceiling of plaster that is painted to resemble stone. The front of the chancel has a carved wooden reredos, surrounding what was originally the baptismal tank and a four-foot high screen. The tank was later removed, covered, and replaced by a communion table that incorporates some of the carvings of the original screen, including six of the Twelve Apostles (Philip, James the Elder, John, Peter, Andrew and Thomas) and figures of angels.

The building was originally constructed with two large elevators as well an early air conditioning system utilizing basement ice storage. In 2019, modern HVAC systems were installed, re-purposing the air ducts to cool the sanctuary.

=== Stained Glass Windows ===
Reflecting the building's Baptist origins, the west window has six panels featuring John Milton, John Bunyan, William Carey, Roger Williams, Adoniram Judson, and Francis Wayland. The east window, which originally had Flemish stained glass windows that were moved to Riverside Church along with the Park Avenue Baptist congregation, was replaced in 1929 by a work of Nicola D'Ascenzo depicting the Sermon on the Mount, David, and Moses. The east window is illuminated by artificial lighting due to the presence of other building structures behind the east end of the church building. The upper arcade windows of the sanctuary are modelled after the grisaille windows of Abbey of St. Sergius, Angers, with spots of painted "dirt" to make the windows appear older. The four aisle windows of the Memorial Chapel were commissioned in 1945 and are the work of the Boston studio of Charles J. Connick.

The East Window was commissioned by Central Presbyterian Church in 1929 as a memorial to the Rev. Dr. Wilton Merle-Smith.

The West Window was designed by Henry Wynd Young and given by Joel S. Whitney in memory of his father.

The Memorial Chapel is in memory of Theodore Cuyler Speers Jr. (son of the Rev. Dr. T. C. Speers), killed in action in Belgium in Jan. 1945.

=== Organ ===
The original organ installed in 1922 was a Hook & Hastings, which was eventually altered by Aeolian-Skinner in 1941 and replaced in 1950 with a 79-rank Möller during Hugh Giles' tenure as music director. Hugh Giles had been a student of Charles Tournemire, through which Cesar Franck's original organ bench from Sainte-Clotilde, Paris had been gifted to him by way of Flor Peeters and once resided at Central. In April 1952, Jean Langlais gave his U.S. debut at Central. The organ was fully restored in 2025.

=== Bells ===
A carillon of 53 bells was originally installed in 1924 but later moved to Riverside Church. A new 50-bell carillon from the Paccard Foundery in Annecy, France was installed in October 2020.

== Leadership ==
=== History of pastors (1821–present) ===
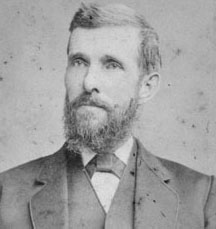
Rev. Dr. William Patton, founder of Central Presbyterian Church

- Rev. Dr. William Patton (1821-1834)
- Rev. Dr. William Adams (1834-1853)
- Rev. Dr. August A. Wood (1853-1860)
- Rev. Dr. James T. Dunn (1864-1868)
- Rev. Dr. James T. Wilson (1869-1888)
- Rev. Dr. Milton Merle-Smith (1889-1920)
- Rev. Dr. Dwight Witherspoon Wylie (1920-1935)
- Rev. Dr. Theodore Cuyler Speers (1936-1958)
- Rev. Dr. Robert A. Edgar (1961-1975)
- Rev. Charles P. Henderson (1978-1986)
- Rev. William Hall Pindar (1989-1998)
- Rev. Elliott Hipp III (2000-2002)
- Rev. Douglas Grandgeorge (2003-2008)
- Rev. Dr. J. Howard Edington (2008-2009)
- Rev. Dr. Douglas D. Webster (2010-2013)
- Rev. Jason D. Harris (2013–present)

Rev. Douglas Grandgeorge was a designated pastor by the presbytery but not called by the congregation.

== Notable members ==
- John McEntee Bowman, Canadian-American businessman
- Thomas Cochran, American banker (1871-1936)
- Frank Presbrey, 20th-century advertising pioneer.
