= William Patton =

William Patton may refer to:

- William Patton (preacher) (1798–1879), American preacher
- William Weston Patton (1821–1899), his son, American abolitionist
- William Hampton Patton (1853–1918), American entomologist
- William Patton (architect), English-born, American architect of churches including Church of Our Saviour (Placerville, California)
- Will Patton (born 1954), American actor
- Billy Joe Patton (1922–2011), American amateur golfer

== See also ==
- William Patten (disambiguation)
- William Paton (disambiguation)
- William Patton Thornton (1817–1883), American physician and educator
