= Caroline G. Boughton =

American educator and social activist (1854-1905)

Caroline Greenbank Boughton
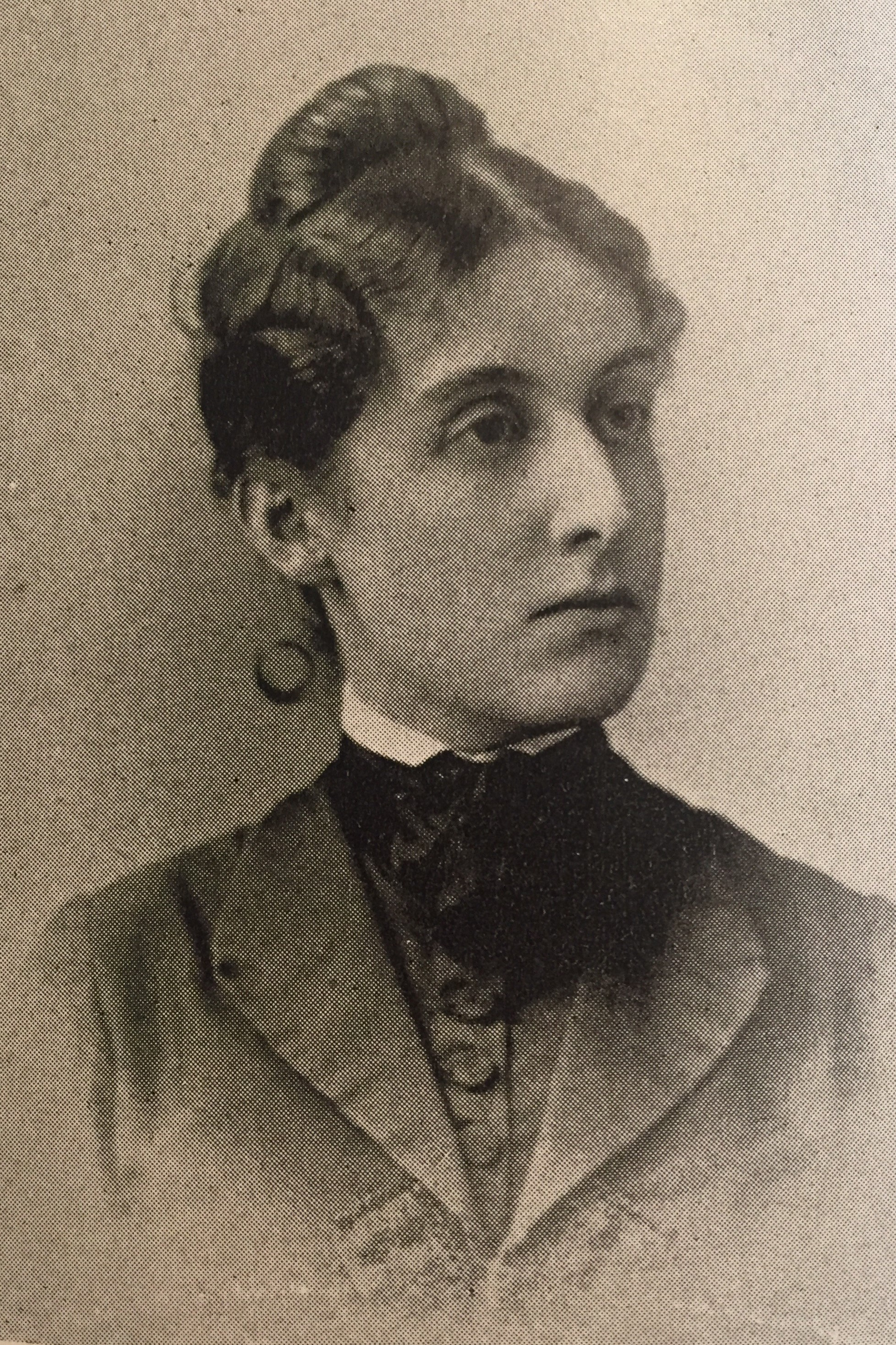
- Born: August 9, 1854; Philadelphia, Pennsylvania, U.S.
- Died: June 1, 1905 (aged 50)
- Resting place: West Laurel Hill Cemetery, Bala Cynwyd, Pennsylvania, U.S.
- Education: Philadelphia Normal School
- Occupations: Educator, social activist

Caroline Greenbank Boughton (August 9, 1854 - June 5, 1905) was an American educator and social activist. She was an advocate for Native American civil rights, temperance, and women's rights. She was active in the American Home Missionary Society, the National Woman Suffrage Association, the New Century Club, the Woman's Christian Temperance Union, and the Women's National Indian Association.

== Early life ==
She was born Caroline Greenbank in Philadelphia, Pennsylvania, on August 9, 1854. She was the second daughter of Judge Thomas Greenbank, whose family was from England. Through her mother, she was related to a branch of the Huestons of Belfast, Northern Ireland.

She graduated from the Philadelphia Normal School in 1874, fifth in a class of eighty.

== Career ==
In the autumn of 1874, Boughton began her career as a teacher in Miss Steven's Seminary in Germantown, Philadelphia. In 1878 she took charge of the department of history in the Philadelphia Normal School, and held that position for four years.

She was active with the Woman's Hospital of Philadelphia and through her connection with the American Home Missionary Society of the Methodist Episcopal Church, became interested in missionary work with Native Americans. She served as a manager of the Women's National Indian Association for five years, and as auditor for eighteen years.

She was an active member of the Woman's Christian Temperance Union until her failing health forced her to curb her activities. Boughton was interested in the advancement of women. She was a member of the New Century Club in Philadelphia, and a member of the National Woman Suffrage Association.

== Personal life ==
On July 25, 1882, she married John W. Boughton, a prominent manufacturer and inventor of Philadelphia.

She died on June 5, 1905, and was interred at West Laurel Hill Cemetery in Bala Cynwyd, Pennsylvania.
