= William Patten =

William Patten may refer to:

- William Waynflete (William Patten, c. 1398–1486), bishop of Winchester, 1447–1486, and Lord Chancellor of England, 1456–1460
- William Patten (historian) (c. 1510 – after 1598), English historian and teller of the English exchequer
- William Patten (zoologist) (1861–1932), American biologist and zoologist
- William J. Van Patten (1848–1920), Vermont businessman and politician
- Gilbert Patten (William George Patten, 1866–1945), writer

== See also ==
- William Patten Primary School in London
- Bill Patten (disambiguation)
- William Patton (disambiguation)
- William Paton (disambiguation)
