= Wethersfield Stone Schoolhouse =

- U.S. National Register of Historic Places
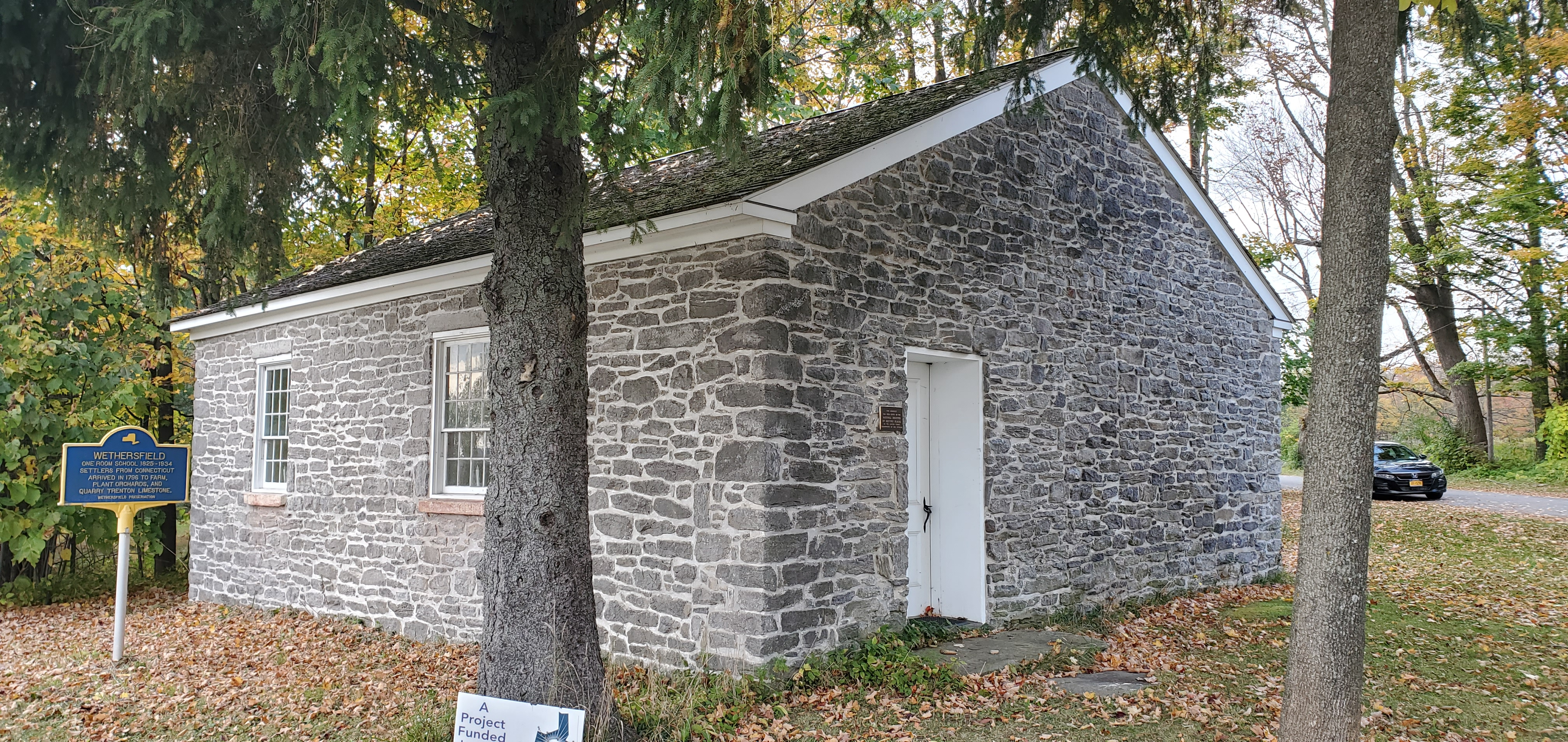
- Wethersfield Stone Schoolhouse, October 2020

- Location within New York Location within the United States
- Location: 9999-9937 Pierce Rd., Holland Patent, New York
- Nearest city: Trenton, New York
- Coordinates: 43°15′30″N 75°13′15″W
- Area: less than one acre
- Built: 1825
- Architectural style: Early Republic
- NRHP reference No.: 05000991
- Added to NRHP: September 7, 2005

Wethersfield Stone Schoolhouse is a historic one room school building located at Trenton in Oneida County, New York, United States. It was built about 1825 and is a vernacular one story, rectangular, gable roofed, stone masonry structure, 26 by 30 feet (7.9 by 9.1 m). It functioned as a public school until 1934.

It was listed on the National Register of Historic Places in 2005.
