= Prospect, New York =

- Hamlet
- Location in Oneida County and the state of New York.
- Coordinates: 43°18′13″N 75°9′8″W
- Country: United States
- State: New York
- County: Oneida
- Settled: 1803
- Incorporated: 1890
- Dissolved: December 31, 2015

Area
  - Total: 0.44 sq mi (1.15 km^{2})
  - Land: 0.43 sq mi (1.11 km^{2})
  - Water: 0.012 sq mi (0.03 km^{2})
- Elevation: 1,184 ft (361 m)

Population (2020)
  - Total: 248
  - Density: 576.4/sq mi (222.54/km^{2})
- Time zone: UTC-5 (Eastern (EST))
  - Summer (DST): UTC-4 (EDT)
- ZIP code: 13435
- Area code: 315
- FIPS code: 36-59883
- GNIS feature ID: 0961155

Prospect is a hamlet in the town of Trenton, in Oneida County, New York, United States. The population was 291 at the 2010 census. The hamlet is located at the junction of NY 365 and Reference Route 920V west of West Canada Creek. It was an incorporated village from 1890 to 2015.

== History ==
The village was founded in 1803 and incorporated in 1890. Residents voted 91–7 to dissolve the village on July 21, 2015. This was primarily due to a lengthy dispute regarding worker's compensation claims from two firefighters. The village officially dissolved on December 31, 2015. It should be classified as a census-designated place by the U.S. Census Bureau within the next couple years. All government activities previously managed by the village are now handled by the Town of Trenton.

The volunteer fire department disbanded in 2014, also due to the said dispute. The volunteer ambulance still remains in service.

== Geography ==
Prospect is located at 43°18′13″N 75°9′8″W (43.303671, -75.152190).

According to the United States Census Bureau, the hamlet has a total area of 0.2 square miles (0.52 km^{2}), all land.

== Demographics ==
Historical population
Census	Pop.	Note	%±
1880	326		—
1900	333		—
1910	278		−16.5%
1920	282		1.4%
1930	277		−1.8%
1940	285		2.9%
1950	318		11.6%
1960	348		9.4%
1970	392		12.6%
1980	368		−6.1%
1990	312		−15.2%
2000	330		5.8%
2010	291		−11.8%
2020	248		−14.8%
U.S. Decennial Census

As of the census of 2000, there were 330 people, 123 households, and 87 families residing in what was then a village. The population density was 1,621.2 inhabitants per square mile (625.9/km^{2}). There were 138 housing units at an average density of 678.0 per square mile (261.8/km^{2}). The racial makeup of the village was 99.09% White, 0.61% African American, and 0.30% from two or more races. Hispanic or Latino of any race were 1.21% of the population.

There were 123 households, of which 39.0% had children under the age of 18 living with them, 50.4% were married couples living together, 14.6% had a female householder with no male present, and 28.5% were non-families. 23.6% of all households were made up of individuals, and 10.6% had someone living alone who was 65 years of age or older. The average household size was 2.68 and the average family size was 3.18.

Of the population, 29.4% were under the age of 18, 6.7% from 18 to 24, 31.8% from 25 to 44, 21.8% from 45 to 64, and 10.3% who were 65 years of age or older. The median age was 36 years. For every 100 females, there were 87.5 males. For every 100 females age 18 and over, there were 95.8 males.

The median annual income for a household in the village was $49,167, and the median income for a family was $50,625. Males had a median income of $32,708 versus $28,333 for females. The per capita income for the village was $16,579. About 3.4% of families and 5.4% of the population were below the poverty line, including 6.7% of those under 18, but none of those age 65 or over.

== Education ==
It is in the Holland Patent Central School District.
