= Lisa Bersales =

Filipino statistician

Lisa Grace S. Bersales is a Filipino statistician, a professor in the School of Statistics of the University of the Philippines, and the new Executive Director V of the Commission on Population and Development (POPCOM). She was the former National Statistician of the Philippines and director of the Philippine Statistics Authority, and the former president of the Philippine Statistical Association.

== Education and careers ==
Bersales has bachelor's, master's, and doctoral degrees in statistics from the University of the Philippines, earned in 1978, 1981, and 1989 respectively. Before becoming the National Statistician of the Philippines, Bersales was director of graduate studies in the School of Statistics of the University of the Philippines, dean of the school, and, since 2010, Vice President for Planning and Finance for the University of the Philippines system.

She became the first National Statistician of the Philippines, serving from 2014 until 2019, when she was succeeded in the post by Dennis Mapa. As National Statistician, she was also the Civil Registrar General of the Philippines, the founding director of the Philippine Statistics Authority, and the director of the 2015 Census of Population of the Philippines.

She was president of the Philippine Statistical Association for the 2018–2019 term.

== Recognition ==
Bersales is an Elected Member of the International Statistical Institute.
