= David Esterly =

American carver, sculptor, and writer (1944–2019)

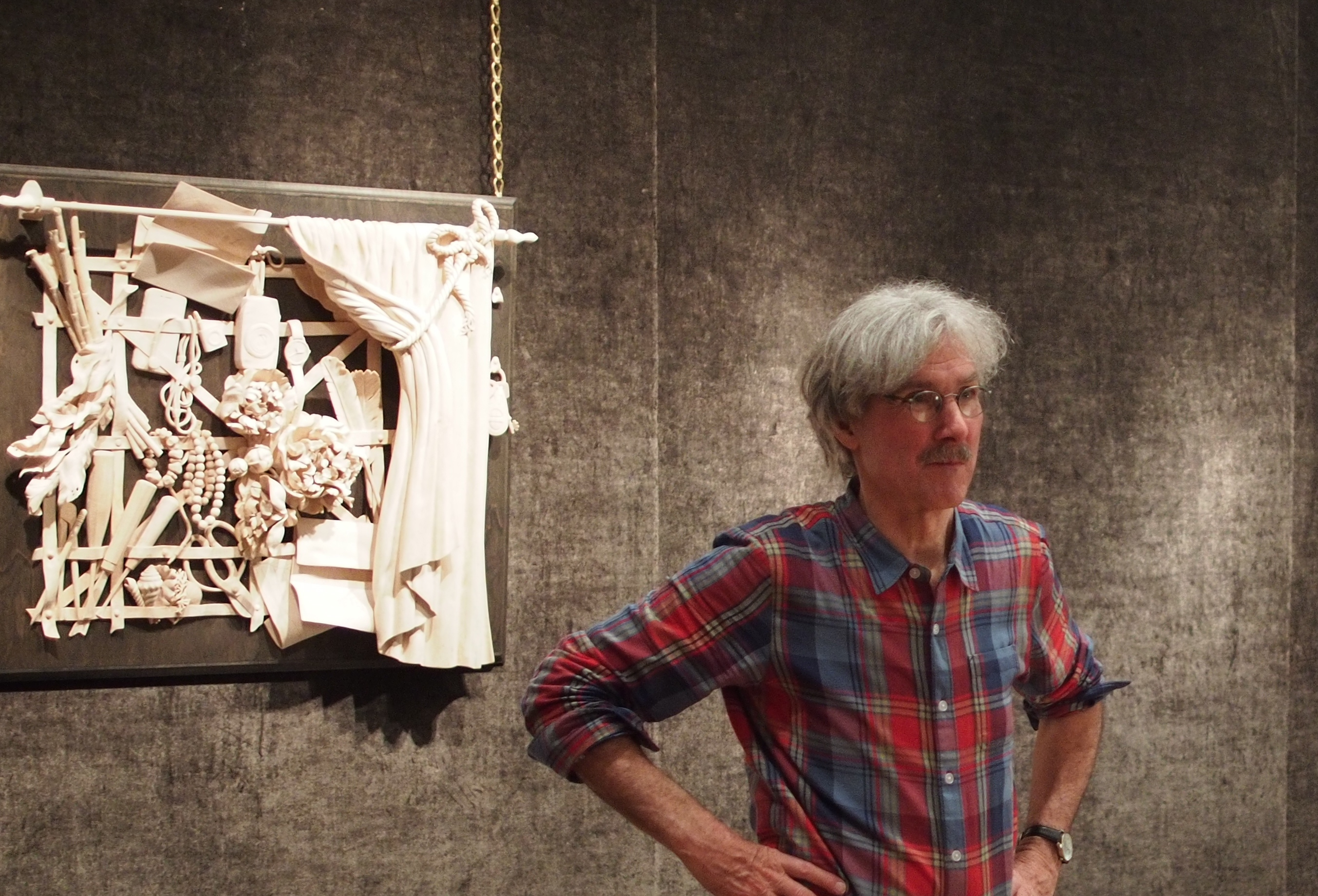
David Esterly (1944-2019) with his piece Quodlibet #7, 2012. Limewood on painted backboard, from the collection of Martha J. Fleischman

James David Esterly Jr. (May 10, 1944 – June 15, 2019) was an American limewood carver, self-described sculptor and writer. He was known as an exponent of the high-relief naturalistic style of the British carver Grinling Gibbons (1648–1721).

== Early life and education ==
Esterly was born in Akron, Ohio but raised in Orange County, California. He received a BA from Harvard and a BA and Ph.D. from Cambridge, where he read English at St Catharine's College and was a Fulbright Scholar. His doctoral dissertation on Yeats and Plotinus was supervised by Thomas Rice Henn.

He had rejected the idea of an academic career even before a conversion experience in 1974, when the sight of a Grinling Gibbons carving behind the altar at St. James, Piccadilly turned him towards woodcarving. Esterly retreated to a cottage in Sussex where he taught himself to carve in the high-relief illusionistic style of Gibbons.

After the 1986 fire at Hampton Court he spent a year re-carving the seven foot long Gibbons drop destroyed in the flames. The experience inspired his memoir The Lost Carving: A Journey to the Heart of Making (2012). In 1998 he curated the Grinling Gibbons exhibition at the Victoria and Albert Museum, which was named as one of the exhibitions of the year by the art journal Apollo. His accompanying book, Grinling Gibbons and the Art of Carving (fifth printing, March 2013), was described as “a marvelous study” that has “a rare intimacy with its subject."

Esterly’s own carving began as decorative foliage work but developed in the direction of still life sculpture, trophy-like tableaus, and botanical heads in the manner of Giuseppe Arcimboldo, which he began carving in 2002 while a guest artist at the American Academy in Rome. He worked on commission for patrons in the United States, Britain, and Europe. Retrospective exhibitions took place in 2013 in New York City and at the Munson-Williams-Proctor Art Institute in Utica, NY.

== Personal life ==
Esterly was married to Marietta von Bernuth and lived in the rural hamlet of Barneveld in upstate New York.

In 2019, at the age of 74, he revealed that he had been diagnosed with ALS. With the help of assistants, he completed his final commission for the Crystal Bridges Museum of American Art. He died at his home in Barneveld on June 15, 2019.

== Examples of David Esterly's Work ==
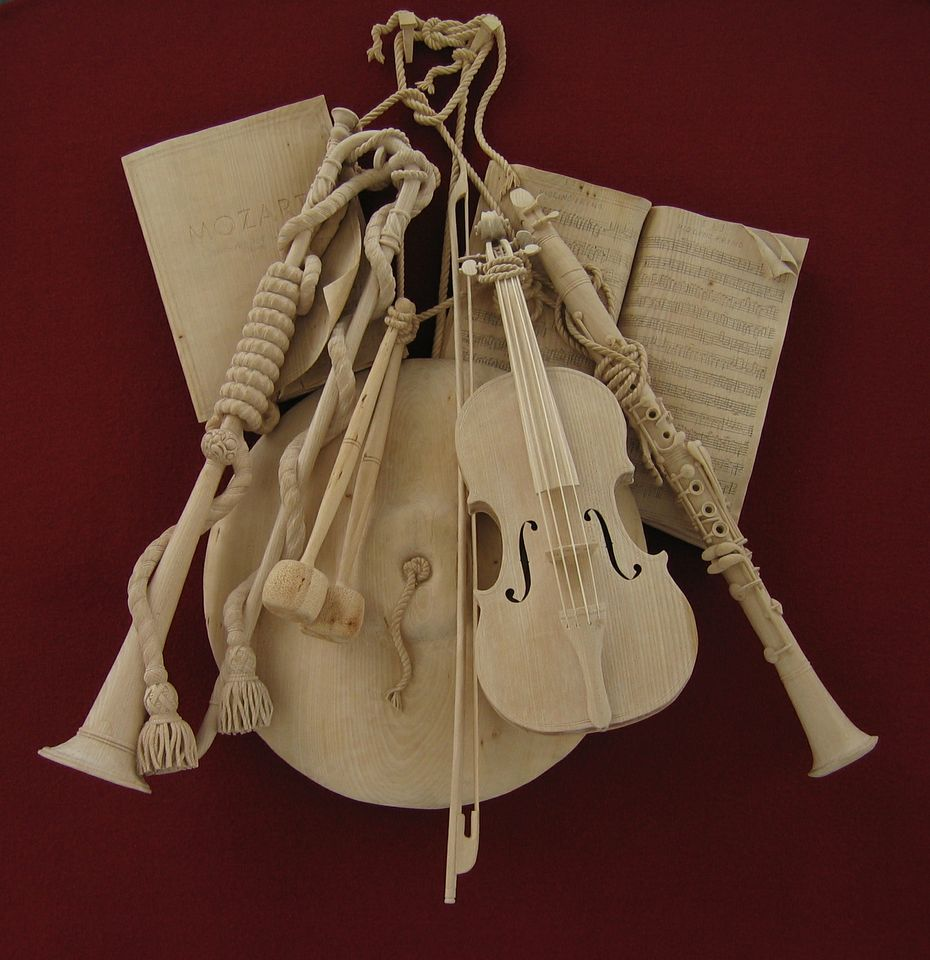
Musical trophy, limewood, 2004.

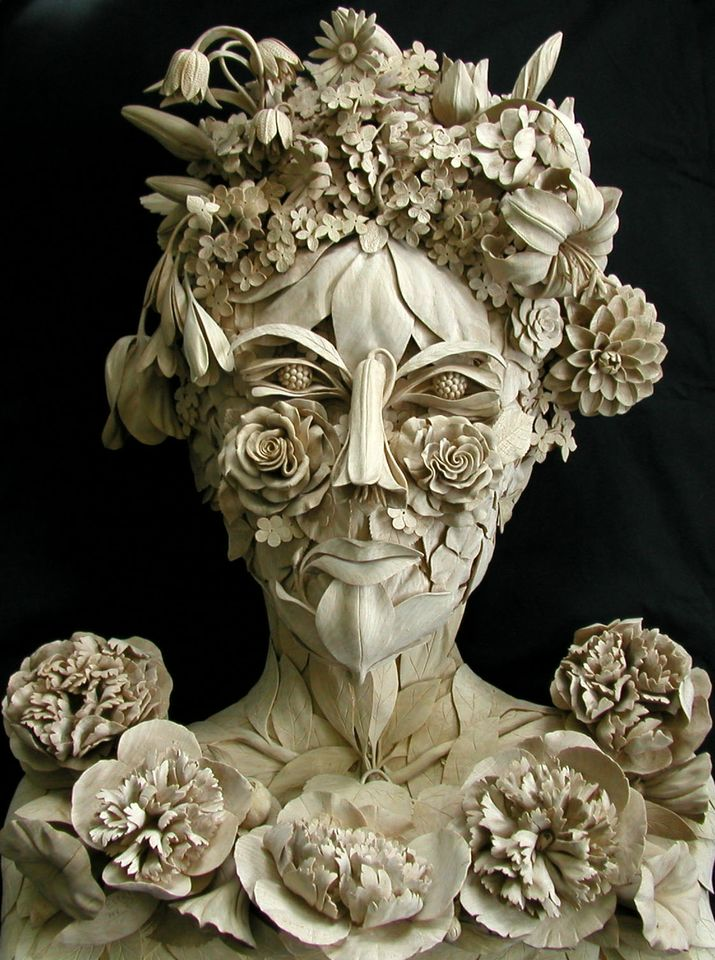
Botanical head, 2005.

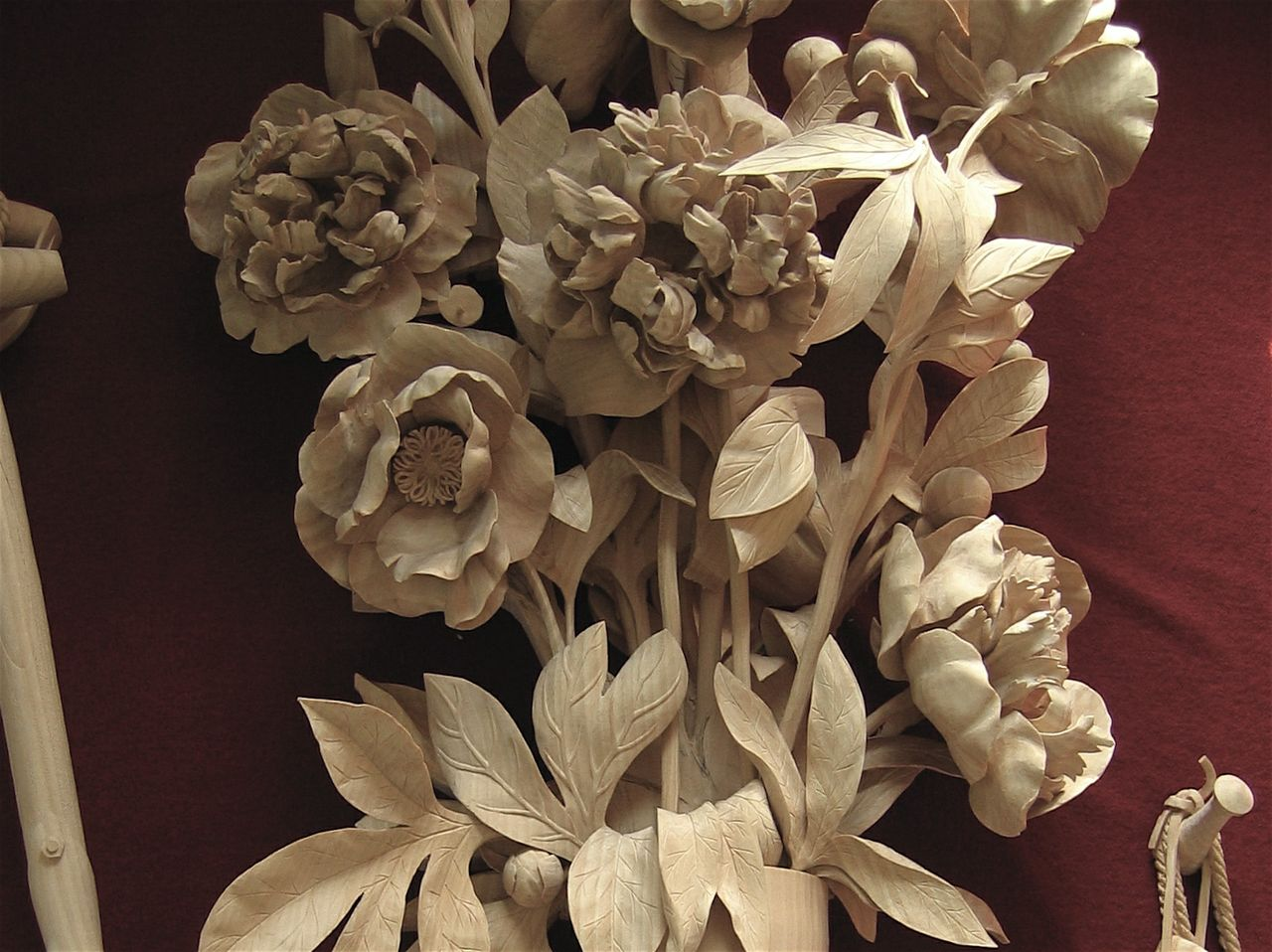
Overmantel (detail), 2007.

== Bibliography ==
- Grinling Gibbons and the Art of Carving, Abrams, 1998
- The Lost Carving: A Journey to the Heart of Making, Viking/Penguin, 2013
