= Bill Patten =

Bill Patten may refer to:

- Bill Patten (baseball), played in 1975 for Anderson Rangers
- Bill Van Patten, academic

== See also ==
- Bill Patton (disambiguation)
- William Patten (disambiguation)
