= Thomas Rice Henn =

Irish literary critic

Thomas Rice Henn (10 November 1901 – 10 December 1974), known professionally as T. R. Henn, was an Irish literary critic.

== Life ==
Henn was born in Albert House, County Sligo, Ireland, and educated in Fermoy and latterly at Aldenham School, before gaining an Exhibition to St. Catharine's College, Cambridge, where he studied the Modern Languages and English triposes and was elected Fellow in 1926. He was Senior Tutor, 1945–47, and President, 1951–61.

He served in the British army in the Second World War, rising to the rank of Brigadier. He served from 1963 to 1968 as Chairman of the Central Organisation of Military Education Committees of the Universities and University Colleges, what is now the Council of Military Education Committees of the Universities of the United Kingdom (COMEC). The Lonely Tower (1950) was a study of W.B. Yeats; he edited The Plays And Poems of J. M. Synge in 1963, and embarked on the Coole edition of the works of Lady Gregory with Colin Smythe, as joint General Editor of the Edition.

He gave the 1965 Warton Lecture on English Poetry. He supervised the Ph. D theses of Harivansh Rai Bachchan and David Esterly on W. B. Yeats.

== Works ==
Henn's works were:

- Longinus and English Criticism (1934)
- Field Sports In Shakespeare (1934)
- The Lonely Tower: Studies in the Poetry of W. B. Yeats (1950)
- Practical Fly-Tying (1950)
- The Apple and the Spectroscope: Being lectures on poetry designed (in the main) for science students (1951/1963)
- The Harvest Of Tragedy (1956)
- Selected Poems (1958)
- Science In Writing (1960)
- Passages For Divine Reading (1963)
- The Plays And Poems of J. M. Synge (ed, 1963)
- Shooting a Bat and other poems (1964)
- W.B. Yeats and the Poetry of War (1965), reproduction of Henn's Warton Lecture
- Kipling (1967)
- The Bible as Literature (1970)
- The Living Image: Shakespeare Essays (1972)
- Introduction to Lady Gregory's Poets and Dreamers (1974)
- Last Essays: Mainly on Anglo-Irish Literature (1976)
- Introduction to George Moore's The Untilled Field (1976)
- Five Arches: A Sketch for an Autobiography, and 'Philoctetes' and Other Poems (1980)
