= Philippine Statistics Authority =

Philippine statistics and census authority

- Pangasiwaan ng Estadístika ng Pilipinas

Agency overview
- Formed: September 12, 2013
- Preceding agencies: National Statistical Coordination Board (NSCB); National Statistics Office (NSO); Bureau of Agricultural Statistics (BAS); Bureau of Labor and Employment Statistics (BLES)
- Type: Statistical services
- Jurisdiction: Government of the Philippines
- Headquarters: PSA Complex, East Avenue, Diliman, Quezon City, Philippines
- Employees: 2,791 (2024)
- Annual budget: ₱9.31 billion (2020)
- Agency executives: Usec. Dennis Mapa, Ph.D., National Statistician and Civil Registrar General; Asec. Daniel A. Ariaso Sr., Deputy National Statistician; DEPDev Sec. Arsenio Balisacan, Chairman, PSA Board of Directors
- Parent agency: Department of Economy, Planning, and Development
- Website: psa.gov.ph

Footnotes
- Data collected are from the official website of the agency.

The Philippine Statistics Authority (Filipino: Pangasiwaan ng Estadistika ng Pilipinas; PSA) is the central statistical authority of the Philippine government that collects, compiles, analyzes, and publishes statistical information on economic, social, demographic, political affairs, and general affairs of the people of the Philippines, as well as enforcing the civil registration functions in the country.

It is an attached agency of the Department of Economy, Planning, and Development (DEPDev) for purposes of policy coordination. The PSA comprises the PSA Board and offices on sectoral statistics, censuses and technical coordination, civil registration, Philippine registry office, central support, and field statistical services.

The National Statistician, who is appointed by the president of the Philippines from a list of nominees submitted by a Special Committee and endorsed by the PSA Board Chairperson, is the head of the PSA and has a rank equivalent to an Undersecretary. Aside from directing and supervising the general administration of the PSA, the National Statistician provides overall direction in the implementation of the Civil Registry Law and related issuances and exercise technical supervision over the civil registrars as Civil Registrar General.

The current National Statistician and Civil Registrar General (NSCRG) is Usec. Dennis Mapa, Ph.D. as appointed by President Rodrigo Duterte in May 2019.

== History and precursor agencies ==
=== Philippine Statistical System ===
Recognizing the need to further enhance the efficiency of the statistical system and improve the timeliness and accuracy of statistics for planning and decision making, the Philippine Statistical System (PSS) was restructured on January 30, 1987. The issuance of Executive Order 121 provided the basis for the structure of the decentralized PSS.

The PSS consists of statistical organizations at all administrative levels, its personnel and the national statistical program. Specifically, the organizations composing the system included the following:

- A policy-making and coordinating body – National Statistical Coordination Board (NSCB)
- A single general-purpose statistical agency – National Statistics Office (NSO)
- A research and training arm – Statistical Research and Training Center (SRTC)
- Units of government engaged in statistical activities either as their primary function or as part of their administrative or regulatory functions

The major statistical agencies in the PSS included the National Statistical Coordination Board (NSCB), National Statistics Office (NSO), Bureau of Agricultural Statistics (BAS), Bureau of Labor and Employment Statistics (BLES), Statistical Research and Training Center (SRTC), and the Department of Economic Statistics of the Bangko Sentral ng Pilipinas (BSP).

=== Precursor agencies ===
==== Bureau of Agricultural Statistics ====
The Bureau of Agricultural Statistics (BAS) was a successor organization to the Bureau of Agricultural Economics (BAECON) and was established on January 30, 1987, by virtue of Executive Order No. 116. It absorbed the Bureau of Fisheries Statistics, and was placed within the Department of Agriculture (DA). It served as the principal government agency for the efficient collection, processing, analysis, and dissemination of official statistics on agriculture and fisheries as inputs to policy and decisions towards a sustainable agricultural development.

In the year 2000, the BAS structural organization was strengthened and reoriented pursuant to the relevant provisions of DA Administrative Order No. 6 series of 1998 in compliance with the provisions of the Agriculture and Fisheries Modernization Act or RA 8435 of 1997. This law designated BAS as the central information source and server of the National Information Network (NIN) of the Department of Agriculture.

==== Bureau of Labor and Employment Statistics (BLES) ====
It was also on January 30, 1987, when the Ministry of Labor and Employment was reorganized anew under Executive Order No. 126 and one of its provisions was the abolition of the Labor Statistics Service and the creation of the Bureau of Labor and Employment Statistics (BLES) as one of the six bureaus of the department. It served as the statistical arm of the Department of Labor and Employment (DOLE), BLES ensured the quality of data being generated by all agencies within the department. Its mandate was to "develop and prescribe uniform standards, nomenclatures and methodologies for the collection, processing, presentation, and analysis of labor and employment data".

==== National Statistical Coordination Board ====
The National Statistical Coordination Board (NSCB) was created by virtue of Executive Order No. 121 as the highest policy-making and coordinating body on statistical matters in the country. Its major goal was to promote the independence, objectivity, integrity, responsiveness, and relevance of the Philippine Statistical System (PSS). It aimed to achieve the development of an orderly statistical system capable of providing timely, accurate and useful data for the planning, programming, and evaluation needs of all sectors of the Philippine economy.

The executive board was headed by the Director-General of the NEDA or his/her designated representative as chairman and assisted by the Undersecretary of the Department of Budget and Management (DBM) as vice-chairman. Other members of the Board consist of Undersecretaries of the remaining Departments as well as the Deputy Governor of the BSP, the Secretary General of the NSCB, the Administrator of the NSO, the executive director of the SRTC the Governor or City Mayor nominated by the League of Governors and City Mayors and a representative from the private sector who is elected by the Board.

==== National Statistics Office ====
The National Statistics Office (NSO) (formerly known as the Bureau of Census and Statistics) was the Philippine government's major statistical agency responsible for collecting, compiling, classifying, producing, publishing, and disseminating general-purpose statistics. The NSO also had the responsibility of carrying out and administering the provision of the Civil Registry Law including the archiving of birth, death, and marriage servicing requests for copies and certifications based on these documents as provided for in Act No. 3753 dated February 1931.

The organization assumed its responsibilities when Commonwealth Act (C.A.) No. 591 was approved on August 19, 1940. It was then known as the Bureau of the Census and Statistics (BCS). It became the National Census and Statistics Office (NCSO) in 1974 until it was renamed to the National Statistics Office by Executive Order No. 121. It was responsible for collecting, compiling, classifying, producing, publishing, and disseminating general-purpose statistics and for carrying out and administering the provisions of the Civil Registry Law.

=== Formation of the PSA ===
The Philippine Statistics Authority was created by virtue of Republic Act No. 10625, otherwise known as the Philippine Statistical Act of 2013, which was signed into law by President Benigno Simeon Aquino III on September 12, 2013. It mandated the reorganization of the PSS and created PSA from merging the four major statistical agencies engaged in primary data collection and compilation of secondary data, namely BAS, BLES, NSCB, and NSO.

List of PSA Undersecretaries – National Statisticians & Civil Registrar Generals
No.	Name	Term Began	Term Ended	President
1	Lisa Grace S. Bersales, Ph.D.	April 21, 2014	April 22, 2019	Benigno S. Aquino III; Rodrigo Duterte
2	Dennis S. Mapa, Ph.D.	May 27, 2019	Present	Rodrigo Duterte; Bongbong Marcos

=== The PSA: 2018 to present ===
==== Philippine Identification System ====
The Philippine Identification System (PhilSys) is the government's central identification platform for all citizens and resident aliens of the Philippines. An individual's record in the PhilSys shall be considered as an official and sufficient proof of identity. It was established through Republic Act No. 11055, which was signed into law by President Rodrigo Duterte on August 6, 2018.

PhilSys aims to eliminate the need to present other forms of identification when transacting with the government and the private sector, subject to appropriate authentication measures based on a biometric identification system. In addition, it aims to be a social and economic platform through which all transactions including public and private services can be availed of and shall serve as the link in the promotion of seamless service delivery, enhancing administrative governance, reducing corruption, strengthening financial inclusion and promoting ease of doing business.

Information to be collected and stored under the PhilSys shall be limited to the following:

- Demographic Data: Full Name; Sex; Date of Birth; Place of Birth; Blood Type; Address; Filipino or Resident Alien; Marital Status (optional); Mobile number (optional); and Email address (optional)
- Biometric Information: Front Facing Photograph; Full set of fingerprints; Iris scan; and If necessary, other identifiable features of an individual as may be determined in the implementing rules and regulations (IRR).

The PhilID can be used in all transactions requiring proof or verification of citizens or resident aliens' identity, such as, but not limited to the following: application for eligibility and access to social welfare and benefits granted by the government; application for services and benefits offered by GSIS, SSS, PhilHealth, HDMF, and other government agencies; applications for passports and driver's license; tax-related transactions; registration and voting identification purposes; admission to any government hospital, health center or similar institution; all other government transactions; application for admission in schools, colleges, learning institutions, and universities, whether public or private; application and transaction for employment purposes; opening of bank accounts and other transactions with banks and other financial institutions; verification of cardholder's criminal records and clearances; such other transactions, uses or purposes, as may be defined in the IRR.

==== Community – Based Monitoring System ====
The Community-Based Monitoring System (CBMS), which was established by Republic Act 11315 and was signed into law by President Rodrigo Duterte on April 17, 2019, is an organized technology-based system of collecting, processing and validating necessary disaggregated data that may be used for planning, program implementation and impact monitoring at the local level which serves as basis in targeting households in the planning, budgeting and implementation of government programs geared towards poverty alleviation and economic development. In addition, it merges the methodologies used in data collection activities of all national agencies, geo-tagging, and the CBMS implemented by local government units (LGUs).

In addition, CBMS entails a census of households undertaken by the LGUs with the participation of the community using an accelerated poverty profiling system in the data collection, processing, mapping and analysis of data. Regular and synchronized data collection is to be conducted by every city and municipality every three years. The PSA is the lead agency in its implementation.

== Mandate ==
The PSA shall primarily be responsible for the implementation of the objectives and provisions of R.A. 10625. It shall plan, develop, prescribe, disseminate and enforce policies, rules and regulations and coordinate government-wide programs governing the production of official statistics, general-purpose statistics, and civil registration services. It shall primarily be responsible for all national censuses and surveys, sectoral statistics, consolidation of selected administrative recording systems and compilation of national accounts.

== Functions ==
The PSA has the following functions: Serve as the central statistical authority of the Philippine government on primary data collection; Prepare and conduct periodic censuses on population, housing, agriculture, fisheries, business, industry, and other sectors of the economy; Collect, compile, analyze, abstract and publish statistical information relating to the country's economic, social, demographic and general activities and condition of the people; Prepare and conduct statistical sample surveys on all aspects of socioeconomic life including agriculture, industry, trade, finance, prices and marketing information, income and expenditure, education, health, culture, and social situations for the use of the government and the public; Carry out, enforce and administer civil registration functions in the country as provided for in Act 3753, the Law on Registry of Civil Status; Collaborate with departments of the national government including GOCCs and their subsidiaries in the collection, compilation, maintenance and publication of statistical information, including special statistical data derived from the activities of those departments, corporations, and their subsidiaries; Promote and develop integrated social and economic statistics and coordinate plans for the integration of those statistics, including the national accounts; Develop and maintain appropriate frameworks and standards for the collection, processing, analysis, and dissemination of data; Coordinate with government departments and local government units (LGUs) on the promotion and adoption of statistical standards involving techniques, methodologies, concepts, definitions, and classifications, and on the avoidance of duplication in the collection of statistical information; Conduct continuing methodological, analytical and development activities, in coordination with the PSRTI, to improve the conduct of censuses, surveys, and other data collection activities; Recommend executive and legislative measures to enhance the development of the statistical activities and programs of the government; Prepare, in consultation with the PSA Board, a Philippine Statistical Development Program (PSDP); Implement policies on statistical matters and coordination, as directed by the PSA Board, and; Perform other functions as may be assigned by the PSA Board and as may be necessary to carry out the purposes of RA 10625.

== PSA Board ==
The PSA Board is the highest policymaking body on statistical matters, and offices on sectoral statistics, censuses and technical coordination, civil registration and central support and field statistical services. It is headed by the Secretary of Socioeconomic Planning and Director-General of NEDA as chairperson, with the Secretary (or the duly designated Undersecretary) of the Department of Budget and Management (DBM) as vice-chairperson. Its members are composed of the following:

- The Secretary or duly designated representative (not lower than an Undersecretary) of the following national government agencies:
  - Commission on Higher Education (CHED);
  - Department of Agrarian Reform (DAR);
  - Department of Agriculture (DA);
  - Department of Education (DepEd);
  - Department of Energy (DOE);
  - Department of Environment and Natural Resources (DENR);
  - Department of Finance (DOF);
  - Department of Foreign Affairs (DFA);
  - Department of Health (DOH);
  - Department of the Interior and Local Government (DILG);
  - Department of Justice (DOJ);
  - Department of Labor and Employment (DOLE);
  - Department of National Defense (DND);
  - Department of Public Works and Highways (DPWH);
  - Department of Science and Technology (DOST);
  - Department of Social Welfare and Development (DSWD);
  - Department of Trade and Industry (DTI);
  - Department of Transportation and Communications (DOTC);
  - Department of Tourism (DOT);
  - Technical Education and Skills Development Authority (TESDA);
- The Deputy Governor or duly designated representative of the Bangko Sentral ng Pilipinas (BSP);
- The President or duly designated representative of the Philippine Statistical Association, Inc. (PSAI);
- The President or duly designated representative of the Union of Local Authorities of the Philippines (ULAP);
- The National Statistician of the PSA;
- The executive director of the Philippine Statistical Research and Training Institute (PSRTI);
- A representative for the private sector; and
- A representative for government-owned and controlled corporations.

The National Statistician acts as ex-officio Chairperson of the PSA Board Secretariat.

The functions of the PSA Board are as follows:

- establishes appropriate mechanisms to promote and maintain an efficient and effective statistical system in the government;
- formulates policies on all matters relating to government statistical operations, standards and classifications;
- review the statistical programs of the departments and agencies of the national government and the LGUs and rationalize responsibilities in these government organizations on matters relating to such statistical programs;
- review budgetary proposals involving statistical operations and submit an integrated budget for the PSS to the Department of Budget and Management (DBM);
- prescribes appropriate frameworks for the improvement of statistical coordination and establish mechanisms for statistical coordination at the regional and LGU levels;
- provides technical assistance and exercise supervision over major government statistical activities;
- recommends executive and legislative measures to enhance the development and efficiency of the system, including the internal structure of statistical agencies; and
- approves the Philippine Statistical Development Program.

== Publications ==
The PSA publishes a large variety of statistical reports, census data, and surveys largely related to the economy of the Philippines. For the complete list of PSA publications and CD products, refer to Philippine Statistics Authority List of Publications. The agency also maintains an online portal of its historical data releases for public consumption through OpenStat.

== See also ==
- Census in the Philippines
- Demographics of the Philippines
- List of national and international statistical services
- Philippine Standard Geographic Code
