= William Paton =

William Paton may refer to:

- William Andrew Paton (1889–1991), American accountant and a founder of the American Accounting Association
- William J. Paton, Scottish footballer who played for Motherwell
- Willie Paton, Scottish footballer who played for Rangers
- William Paton (ecumenist) (1886–1943), General Secretary of the National Christian Council of India, Burma and Ceylon between 1922 and 1927
- Sir William D.M. Paton (1917–1993), British pharmacologist, son of the above

== See also ==
- William Patton (disambiguation)
- William Patten (disambiguation)
