= John Waldo Douglas =

American politician

John Waldo Douglas (April 14, 1818 – September 24, 1883) was an American Presbyterian minister.

Douglas was born in Trenton, N. Y., April 14, 1818.

Douglas graduated from Yale College in 1840. He taught school for a time in the South, and in 1844 began the study of theology in the Union Seminary, New York City. On completing (after some interruptions) his course there in 1848, he was intending to go as a missionary of the American Board to Africa; but the acquisition of California by treaty at that date appealed to him strongly, and he sailed for the California Territory in December, under a commission from the American Home Missionary Society. He was ordained November 29, 1848, as a Presbyterian minister. For eighteen months he labored in San Jose, and thence went to Los Angeles. From Los Angeles he removed in 1851 to San Francisco to act as editor and proprietor of The Pacific, a weekly religious newspaper which was begun at that time. After four years of very severe labor in this position he parted, in the autumn of 1855, with his interest in the paper, resigned the editorship, and returned to his mother's home in Trenton. He did not resume ministerial labors, but spent his time in literary work and in the care of his health, which was never robust. During the American Civil War, he was in the civil service on the Union side in connection with military railroads in North Carolina, and in 1864 was a member of the New York State Assembly from Oneida County.

He died, after a few hours' illness, of congestive chills, at North Lake, Herkimer County, N. Y., September 24, 1883, in his 66th year. He was never married.

This article incorporates public domain material from the 1884 Yale Obituary Record.

New York State Assembly
Preceded by Isaac McDougall	New York State Assembly; Oneida County, 4th District; 1864	Succeeded by George W. Cole
