= Mary E. Drake =

American Congregational church minister (1833–1916)

Rev. Mary E. Drake
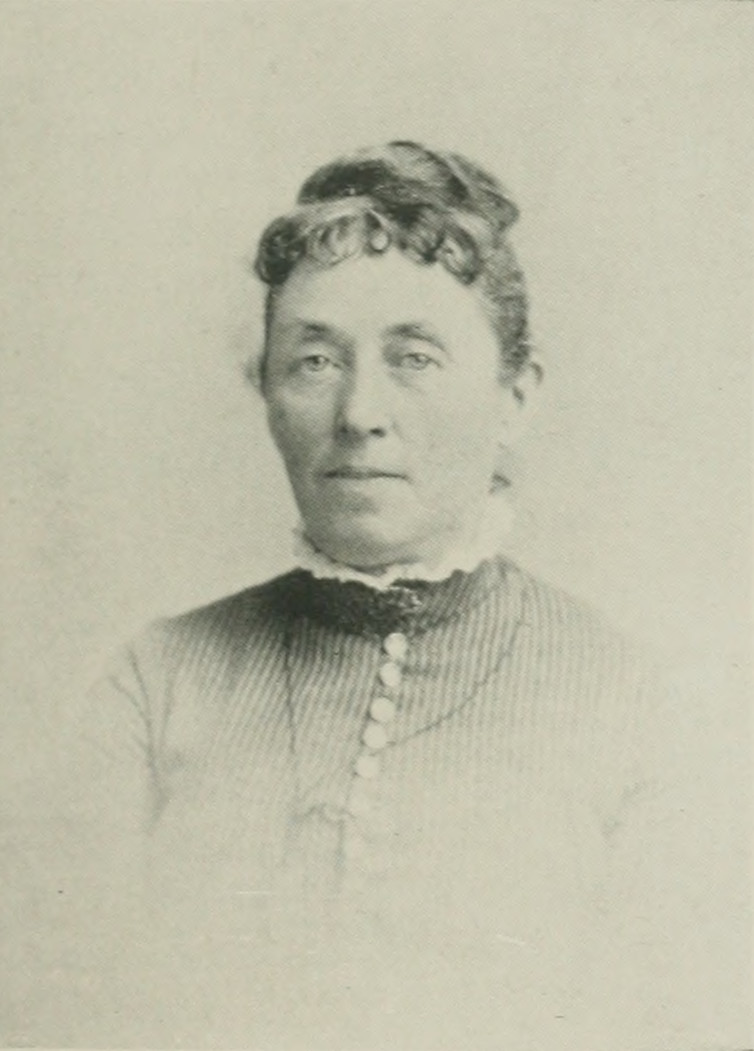
- Portrait photo from A Woman of the Century
- Born: Mary Eveline McArthur; June 8, 1833; Trenton, New York, U.S.
- Died: March 5, 1916 (aged 82); Portland, Oregon, U.S.
- Occupations: minister; home missionary worker
- Employer: American Home Missionary Society
- Known for: One of the first women ordained to the Congregational ministry west of the Mississippi River.
- Spouses: Mr. Marshall; Andrew Jones Drake (m. 1883–1893); Smith Norton (m. 1895–1914)
- Children: 1

Mary E. Drake (née McArthur; after first marriage, Marshall, after second marriage, Drake, after third marriage, Norton; 1833–1916) was an American Congregational church minister and Home Missionary worker. She was one of the first women ordained to the Congregational ministry west of the Mississippi River.

== Early life and education ==
Mary Eveline McArthur was born in Trenton, New York, June 8, 1833. Her parents were Harry and Charlotte Ann (Gurney) McArthur. Her father was of Scotch parentage, and her mother was English, a relative of Lady Gurney, better known as Elizabeth Fry. From her parents, Drake inherited a strong religious bent of character that distinguished her life.

When about six years of age, she removed with her parents to southern Michigan, where she received most of her common school and academic education. From there, the family removed to the town of Geneseo, Illinois.

== Career ==
After marrying Mr. Marshall, they spent their early married life in Geneseo, and she resided there most of the time for over twenty years.

She joined her mother's church, the Congregational, and began applying personal effort for the conversion of others to Christianity. In addition to her work in prayer meetings, Sunday school, and young people's Bible classes, she was frequently called to assist evangelists by visiting with them and attending revival meetings. During all that time, she was also active in all the various reforms of the time.

During the civil war, she was especially active in the Women's Soldiers' Aid Society, going south as far as Memphis, Tennessee and looking to the proper distribution of the provisions sent to the hospitals there.

She was one of the leaders in the women's temperance crusade. Drake had the added care of her family, which she supported most of the time by her.

The result of such constant activity came in a severe attack of nervous prostration, which totally ended her work for a season. To regain her health, she went to reside for a time with her only living son, Martin Murray Marshall, then a railroad official in western Iowa.

While in western Iowa, she married Rev. Andrew Jones Drake, of Dakota Territory. A few weeks after relocating to the bracing air of Dakota Territory, her health was restored. She entered into the home missionary work with her husband, for which they were well adapted by her zeal and his long experience. Mr. Drake was then laboring in Iroquois, South Dakota, a village at the junction of two railroads, where he had a small church of eight members worshiping in a schoolhouse. Though living for the first two years at De Smet, South Dakota, 16 miles (26 km) away, they soon had other preaching stations and Sunday schools under their supervision and preparations were made for building a church in Iroquois.

Drake went east as far as Chicago and raised sufficient means to buy the lumber and push the work forward. Encouraged by her success, she was readily urged by her husband to take part in the public services, addressing Sunday schools, till she came very naturally to choose a subject or text and practically to preach the gospel. The wide extent of their field and the constant need of dividing their labors tended strongly to this. A much needed rest and the kindness of an eastern friend enabled the couple to attend the anniversary of the American Home Missionary Society in Saratoga Springs, New York on the way. By special invitation, she addressed the Woman's Home Missionary Union of Illinois in Moline. Being heard in that meeting by Dr. Joseph B. Clark, of the American Home Missionary Society, on arrival at Saratoga, she was called to address the large congregation assembled there. She subsequently spoke in many of the large cities and churches of New England and other States. The result of these visits was the raising of financial means sufficient, with what people on the ground could give, to build two other large churches in South Dakota at Esmond and Osceola. Rev. and Mrs. Drake then cared for a field 45 miles (72 km) in length and 15 miles (24 km) in breadth, with live churches and Sunday schools. They also published a monthly paper, entitled the Dakota Prairie Pioneer.

At the request of the leading ministers in South Dakota, Drake consented to ordination and the largest Congregational council ever assembled in South Dakota ordained her to the work of the ministry in December 1890 at Iroquois, South Dakota. That was one of the first ordinations of a woman to the ministry west of the Mississippi River.

Widowed in 1893, Drake was engaged in city missionary work on the east side of Des Moines, Iowa for four years, beginning in that year. In 1894, she published Fanny's Autobiography, A Story of Home Missionary Life on the Frontier (Boston and Chicago, Congregational Sunday-school and Publishing Society). The Home Missionary horse is represented as describing the life of her owners in far off Dakota. It is meant to interest young readers in the needs of the Home Mission work, telling of the hardships of comfortless homes, cold winters, insufficient supplies, and the inventive devices to overcome these.

After her third marriage, to Rev. James Norton, a pastor of the Congregational church at Newfane, Vermont and at Oberlin, Ohio, she became his assistant.

== Personal life ==
She firstly married Mr. Marshall; they had a son, Martin Murray Marshall. Secondly, she married Rev. Andrew Jones Drake (d. 1893) at Iroquois, South Dakota, on August 21, 1883. Thirdly, on November 7, 1895, she married Rev. Smith Norton (d. 1914).

In later life, she resided for many years in Albany, Oregon. She died March 5, 1916, at the Mann Home for the Aged in Portland, Oregon, after an extended illness.

== Selected works ==
- Drake, M. E., Fanny's Autobiography: A Story of Home Missionary Life on the Frontier (1894) (text)
