= Adam Gerard Mappa =

Dutch type-founder, Patriot and colonel

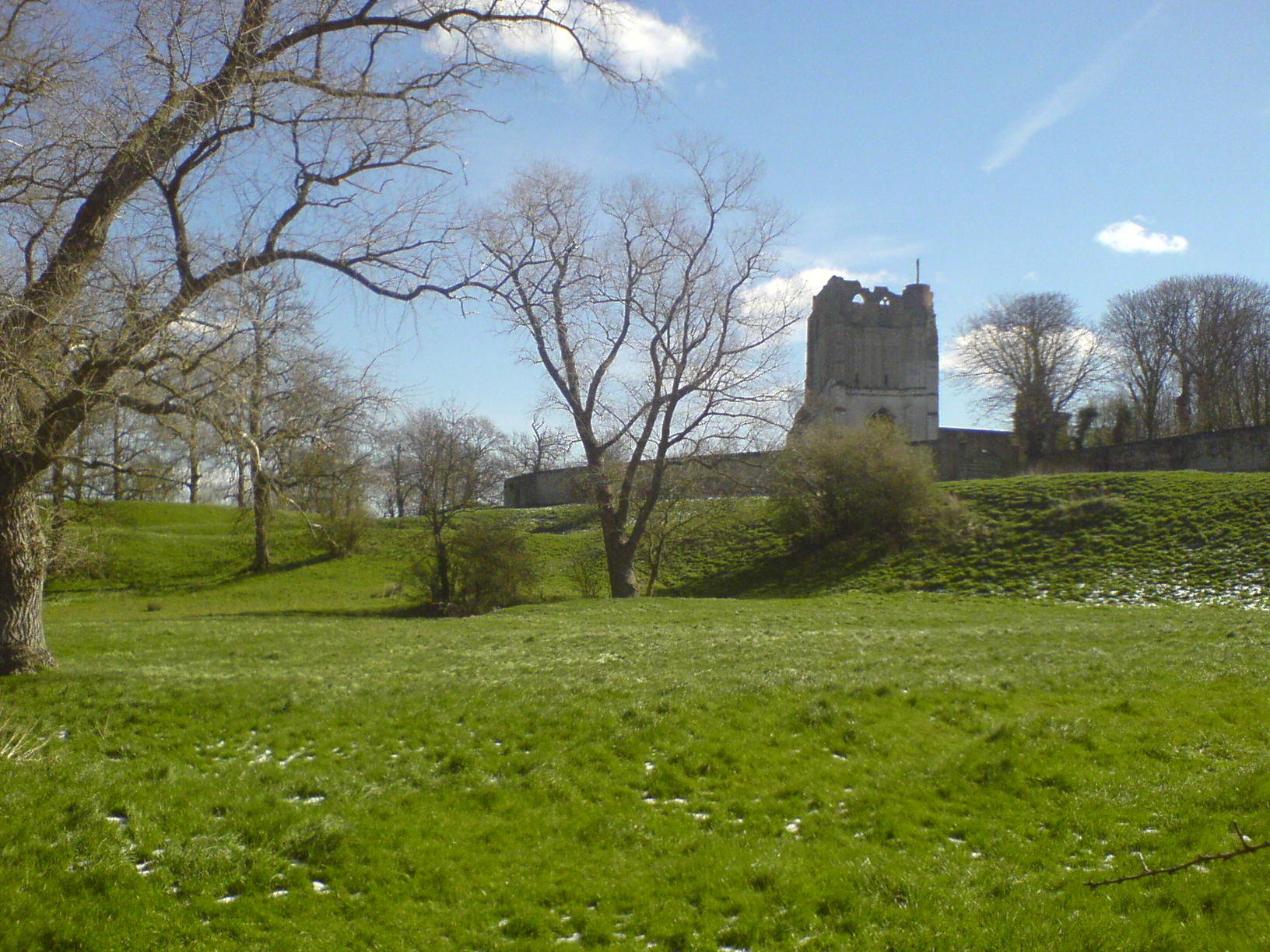
- La Tour de l'Abbaye Notre-Dame du Mont
- Born: 25 November 1754; Tournai
- Died: 15 April 1828 (aged 73); Barneveld, New York
- Military career
- Allegiance: Netherlands
- Branch: Militia
- Rank: Colonel
- Conflicts: Democratizing the vroedschap of Utrecht
- Other work: Agent for the Holland Land Company in New York

Adam Gerard Mappa (Tournai, 25 November 1754 – Barneveld, New York, 15 April 1828) was a Dutch type-founder, Patriot and active colonel in a local militia (in Dutch exercitiegenootschap). In 1794 he became the agent for the Holland Land Company in New York (state) and three years later supervisor in the recently set up village of Barneveld.

== Life ==
Around 1786 Adam Gerard Mappa became the commander of a flying army unit, consisting of 300 men and 200 horses, that played a role in democratizing the vroedschap of Utrecht. One of the people he cooperated with was Quint Ondaatje. From the end of August 1787 under his leadership, the flying army was involved in removing all the Orangists from the vroedschaps in Delft, Gorkum, Montfoort and Vlaardingen. (The removals found place under the threat of a Prussian ultimatum and before the raid). The purge in Delft not only brought Wybo Fijnje, the editor of a patriot newspaper and the auto-didact Gerrit Paape to power in the city, but delivered to the Patriots one of the biggest arsenals and magazines in the Republic. His army went to defend Woerden in the east of the province of Holland, but had no chance to win against 20,000 well trained Prussian soldiers. Mappa made a brave show of defending Naarden but once again with the peculiarly Dutch show for legality, receiving orders from the now counter-revolutionised States of Holland, capitulated on the 27th. On 9 October 1787, the patriots were forced to hand in their unit weapons in Amsterdam and Mappa fled like so many others to northern France.

With a few friends, like Johan Valckenaer and Herman Willem Daendels he rented an uninhabited castle in Watten. This community, growing its own vegetables, playing billiards and discussing the revolution has been described by Gerrit Paape. On the eve of a condemnation, Antje Mappa-Paspoort (a great friend of Emilie Luzac), travelled hurriedly and secretly to Delft, when her husband decided to emigrate to the US, and it is said on the advice of Thomas Jefferson he took his type foundry with him.

On 1 December 1789, he arrived with his wife and children to New York and they were granted accommodation with John Adams on Richmond Hill. Mappa became the New York City's very first type-manufacturer (on 22 Greenwich Street, Manhattan) but, even though he could produce Oriental letters, the business was not a success. In 1794, he took over from Gerrit Boon an appointment as agent of the Holland Land Company in Trenton. His best friend François Adriaan van der Kemp, whom Mappa once called a hermit, came to live in the town's surroundings on a farm. Mappa had a new house, built around 1810 and paid by the Company, in the Georgian style, and "Mappa Hall" still exists. In 1818 he bought 34,000 unsold acres from the Holland Land Company. Mappa Hall was listed on the National Register of Historic Places in 1982.

Mappa corresponded with Pieter Vreede and Johan Luzac and at the end of his life he hit financial difficulties, not being able the pay his debts to the Holland Land Company.

== Bibliography ==
- Fairchild, Helen L. (1903) Francis Adrian van der Kemp, 1752-1829 NY: G.P. Putnam's sons.
- Fijnje-Luzac, E. Myne beslommerde boedel; brieven in ballingschap 1787–1788. Ed. Jacques J.M. Baartmans 2003.
