= Trenton, New York =

- Town
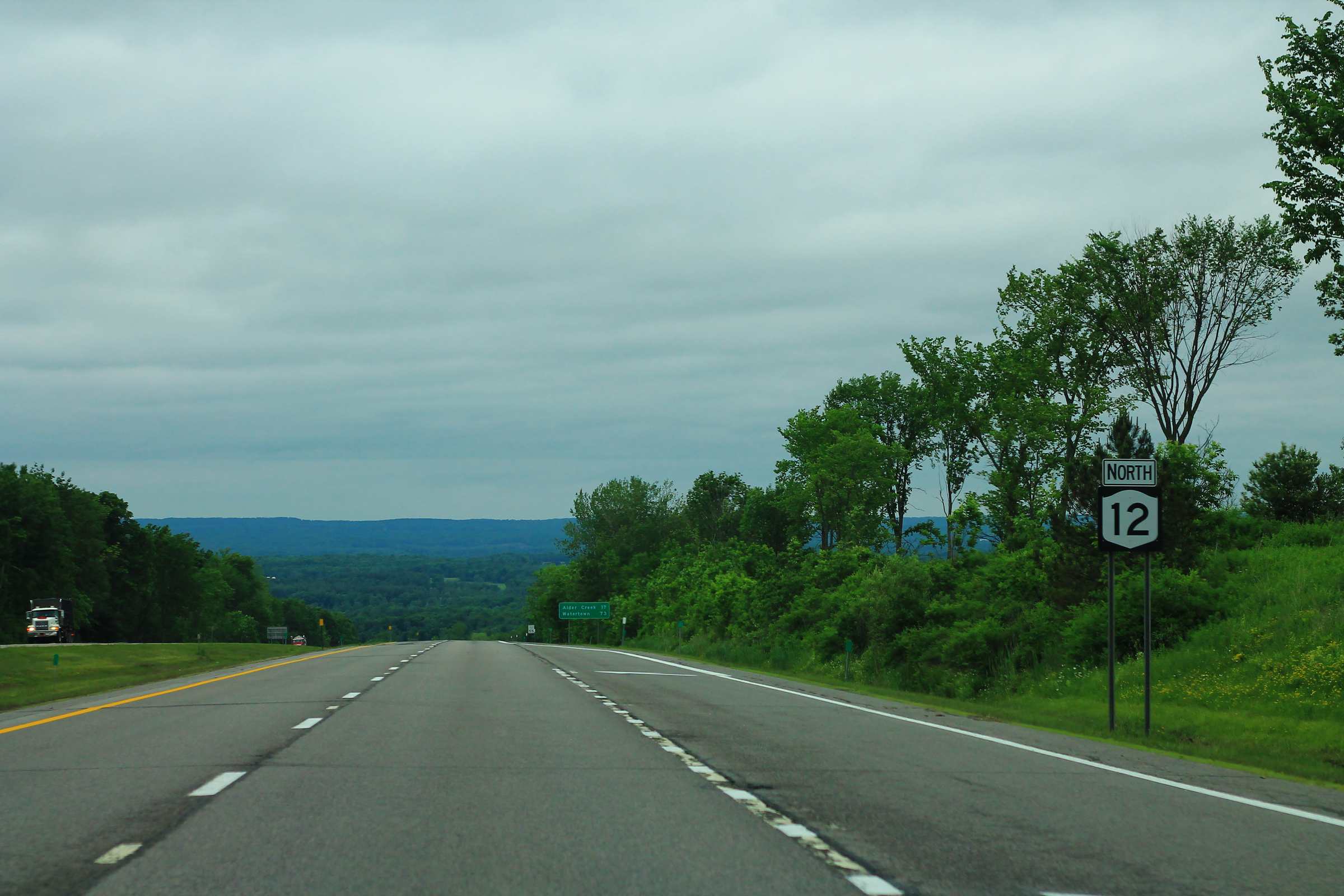
- Northbound NY 12 in Trenton

- Location in Oneida County and the state of New York.
- Coordinates: 43°15′19″N 75°11′26″W
- Country: United States
- State: New York
- County: Oneida

Government
  - Type: Town Council
  - Town Supervisor: Stephen A Godfrey (R)
  - Town Council: Members' List: • Stephen A. Godfrey (R); • Michael J. Bennison (R); • Betsy Beil Mack (R); • Michael Hoke (R)

Area
  - Total: 43.72 sq mi (113.23 km^{2})
  - Land: 43.37 sq mi (112.34 km^{2})
  - Water: 0.34 sq mi (0.88 km^{2})
- Elevation: 817 ft (249 m)

Population (2020)
  - Total: 4,297
  - Density: 99.1/sq mi (38.25/km^{2})
- Time zone: UTC-5 (Eastern (EST))
  - Summer (DST): UTC-4 (EDT)
- ZIP Codes: 13304 (Barneveld); 13352 (Hinckley); 13354 (Holland Patent); 13435 (Prospect); 13438 (Remsen); 13502 (Utica)
- FIPS code: 36-75280
- GNIS feature ID: 0979556
- Website: trentonny.gov

Trenton (called Ose-te-a-da-que, "in the bone" by the Haudenosaunee) is a town in Oneida County, New York, United States. The population was 4,297 at the 2020 census.

== History ==
The first settlement was developed in 1793 by Gerrit Boon in Barneveldt, as an agent of the Holland Land Company. Boon went back to Holland after a few years. His successor was Adam Gerard Mappa, a Dutch typesetter. At the end of his life, Mappa's friend Francis Adrian Vanderkemp moved to Barneveld.

The town was formed in 1797 from the Town of Schuyler (in Herkimer County, New York). The name may have been selected because some local soldiers fought at the Battle of Trenton. The town includes areas from the Holland and Servis Patents.

The Wethersfield Stone Schoolhouse was listed on the National Register of Historic Places in 2005.

== Geography ==
According to the United States Census Bureau, the town has a total area of 43.7 square miles (113 km^{2}), of which 43.4 square miles (112 km^{2}) is land and 0.3 square miles (0.78 km^{2}) (0.78%) is water.

The West Canada Creek forms the eastern town line, the border of Herkimer County.

The town lent its name to the "Trenton Group", a limestone bed that extends to Minnesota.

The Wethersfield Stone Schoolhouse was listed on the National Register of Historic Places in 2005.

== Demographics ==
Historical population
| Census | Pop. | Note | %± |
|---|---|---|---|
| 1800 | 624 | | — |
| 1810 | 1,548 | | 148.1% |
| 1820 | 2,617 | | 69.1% |
| 1830 | 3,221 | | 23.1% |
| 1840 | 3,178 | | −1.3% |
| 1850 | 3,540 | | 11.4% |
| 1860 | 3,504 | | −1.0% |
| 1870 | 3,156 | | −9.9% |
| 1880 | 3,097 | | −1.9% |
| 1890 | 2,709 | | −12.5% |
| 1900 | 2,628 | | −3.0% |
| 1910 | 2,402 | | −8.6% |
| 1920 | 2,389 | | −0.5% |
| 1930 | 2,262 | | −5.3% |
| 1940 | 2,295 | | 1.5% |
| 1950 | 2,522 | | 9.9% |
| 1960 | 3,417 | | 35.5% |
| 1970 | 4,429 | | 29.6% |
| 1980 | 4,683 | | 5.7% |
| 1990 | 4,682 | | 0.0% |
| 2000 | 4,670 | | −0.3% |
| 2010 | 4,498 | | −3.7% |
| 2020 | 4,297 | | −4.5% |
U.S. Decennial Census

As of the census of 2000, there were 4,670 people, 1,776 households, and 1,287 families residing in the town. The population density was 107.8 inhabitants per square mile (41.6/km^{2}). There were 1,932 housing units at an average density of 44.6 per square mile (17.2/km^{2}). The racial makeup of the town was 98.07% White, 0.39% African American, 0.06% Native American, 0.54% Asian, 0.17% from other races, and 0.77% from two or more races. Hispanic or Latino of any race were 0.34% of the population.

There were 1,776 households, out of which 35.6% had children under the age of 18 living with them, 58.5% were married couples living together, 9.0% had a female householder with no husband present, and 27.5% were non-families. 22.9% of all households were made up of individuals, and 8.6% had someone living alone who was 65 years of age or older. The average household size was 2.61 and the average family size was 3.07.

In the town, the population was spread out, with 27.0% under the age of 18, 6.2% from 18 to 24, 27.6% from 25 to 44, 26.7% from 45 to 64, and 12.5% who were 65 years of age or older. The median age was 39 years. For every 100 females, there were 99.1 males. For every 100 females age 18 and over, there were 99.4 males.

The median income for a household in the town was $49,559, and the median income for a family was $56,377. Males had a median income of $32,523 versus $28,516 for females. The per capita income for the town was $23,139. About 2.6% of families and 5.9% of the population were below the poverty line, including 7.4% of those under age 18 and 3.5% of those age 65 or over.

== Communities and locations in Trenton ==
- Barneveld – The hamlet of Barneveld is in the east-central part of the town, west of Trenton Falls.
- Barneveld Station – A location south of Barneveld on New York State Route 12 (NY 12).
- Fox Hill – An elevation located north-northeast of Barneveld.
- Hinckley – A hamlet located on NY 365 near the Hinckley Reservoir on the north bank of West Canada Creek.
- Holland Patent – The Village of Holland Patent is in the southwestern part of the town on NY 365.
- Mapledale – A location south of Barneveld.
- Prospect – A hamlet in the northeastern corner of the town.
- South Trenton – Located off NY 12 near the southern town border with Deerfield.
- Steuben Valley – A hamlet at the western town line.
- Trenton Falls – A waterfall and hamlet at the eastern town line on West Canada Creek.
- Trenton Falls Station – A location west of Trenton Falls.

== Notable people ==
- John Waldo Douglas (1818–1883) - Presbyterian minister born in Trenton
- Mary E. Norton (1833-1916) - Congregational minister and home missionary worker, born in Trenton
- Hal Schumacher, (1910–1993), was a professional baseball player for New York Giants.
- Daniel H. Wells (1814–1891) - frontier politician, religious leader born in Trenton
