= William Weston Patton =

American abolitionist (1821–1889)

William W. Patton
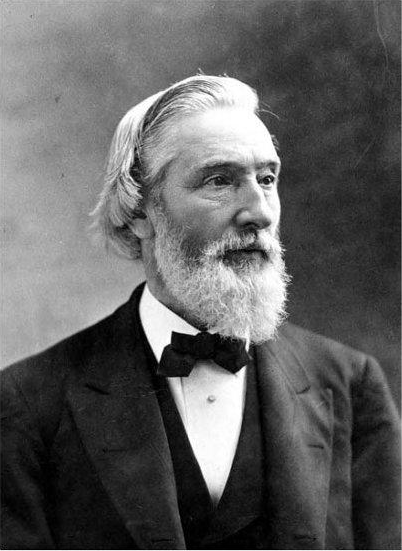
- William Weston Patton (photo by Charles Delevan Mosher)
- Born: October 19, 1821; New York, New York, U.S.
- Died: October 21, 1889 (aged 68); New York, New York, U.S.
- Education: New York University; Union Theological Seminary
- Occupation: 5th President of Howard University
- Known for: His lyrics of "John Brown's Body"

William Weston Patton (October 19, 1821 – October 21, 1889), was a Protestant preacher abolitionist, academic administrator, and scholar. He served as the fifth president of Howard University, and one of the contributors to the words of "John Brown's Body".

== Early life ==
He was the son of Rev. William Patton and his wife Mary, and the grandson of Anglo-Irish Congregationalist immigrant and Revolutionary War soldier Major Robert Patton.

Patton graduated from New York University and the Union Theological Seminary and was ordained as a minister in the Presbyterian Church in 1841; he later moved to the Congregational Church and helped to set up the Chicago Theological Seminary.

== Abolitionism ==
Patton took an earnest part in the anti-slavery movement, and was chairman of the committee that presented to President Lincoln, September 13, 1862, the memorial [resolutions] from Chicago asking him to issue a proclamation of emancipation.

In 1887, Patton read a paper before the Maryland Historical Society entitled "President Lincoln and the Chicago Memorial on Emancipation" recalling the actual dialogue with President Lincoln at that meeting on Thursday, September 13, 1862. The original copy of that paper is held in the Mugar Memorial Library at Boston University. He was vice-president of the Northwestern sanitary commission during the American Civil War, and as such repeatedly visited the eastern and western armies, publishing several pamphlet reports. In 1886, he went, on behalf of the freedmen, to Europe, where, and in the Orient, he remained nearly a year.

=== John Brown's Body ===
In October 1861 Patton wrote new lyrics to the battle song John Brown's Body, the first with complete verses and a consistent meter; these were published in the Chicago Tribune on December 16, 1861. Even more than the previous words, the new words glorify the violent anti-slavery acts of the abolitionist John Brown and his followers. The third verse directly refers to the attack on the armory in Harpers Ferry, West Virginia. Verse four compares John Brown to John the Baptist.

He captured Harper’s Ferry, with his nineteen men so few,
And frightened "Old Virginny" till she trembled thru and thru;
They hung him for a traitor, themselves the traitor crew,
But his soul is marching on.

John Brown was John the Baptist of the Christ we are to see,
Christ who of the bondmen shall the Liberator be,
And soon thruout the Sunny South the slaves shall all be free,
For his soul is marching on.

These themes were further refined two months later by Julia Ward Howe; her version came to be known as The Battle Hymn of the Republic. Where Patton only wrote "of the Christ we are to see", Howe testified that her eyes had already "seen the glory of the coming of the Lord".

== Academic career ==
Patton graduated from New York University in 1839 and Union Theological Seminary in 1842. After taking charge of a Congregational church in Boston, Massachusetts for three years, he became a pastor of one in Hartford, Connecticut, in 1846, and in Chicago, Illinois, in 1857. He received the degree of D.D. from DePauw University, Indiana, in 1864, and that of LL.D. from New York University in 1882.

From 1867-72, he was editor of The Advance in that city, and during 1874 he was lecturer on modern skepticism at Oberlin College (Ohio) and Chicago theological seminaries. From 1877-89 he was president of Howard University (Washington, D.C.). He filled the chair of natural theology and evidences of Christianity in its theological department.

== Family ==
He married Sarah Jane Mott in 1843 and they had three children; after Sarah’s death, he married Mary Boardman Smith and they had six children.

== Publications ==
Patton is the author of The Young Man (Hartford, 1847; republished as The Young Man's Friend, Auburn, New York, 1850); Conscience and Law (New York, 1850); Slavery and Infidelity (Cincinnati, 1856); Spiritual Victory (Boston, 1874); and Prayer and Its Remarkable Answers (Chicago, 1875).

- Publications by William W. Patton, Internet Archive (archive.org). Accessed November 5, 2022.
