= Barneveld, New York =

- Hamlet and CDP
- Location in Oneida County and the state of New York.
- Coordinates: 43°16′28″N 75°11′16″W
- Country: United States
- State: New York
- County: Oneida

Area
  - Total: 0.42 sq mi (1.10 km^{2})
  - Land: 0.42 sq mi (1.10 km^{2})
  - Water: 0 sq mi (0.00 km^{2})
- Elevation: 761 ft (232 m)

Population (2020)
  - Total: 272
  - Density: 643.2/sq mi (248.35/km^{2})
- Time zone: UTC-5 (Eastern (EST))
  - Summer (DST): UTC-4 (EDT)
- ZIP code: 13304
- Area code: 315
- FIPS code: 36-04528
- GNIS feature ID: 2791520

Barneveld is a hamlet (and census-designated place) located within the Town of Trenton in Oneida County, New York, United States. The population was 284 at the 2010 census, when it was an incorporated village. The name is derived from the name of the Dutch statesman Johan van Oldenbarnevelt (1547–1619).

The hamlet is in the eastern part of the town on NY 365.

== History ==
The village was founded in 1793 by Gerrit Boon, an agent of the Holland Land Company.

Mappa Hall was listed on the National Register of Historic Places in 1982.

In 1903, the post office and railroad station were redesignated as "Barneveld", though the legal name of the village was "Trenton", though it was only in 1975 that the legal name of the village was changed to Barneveld; prior to that, the village was still legally "Village of Trenton".

== Geography ==
According to the United States Census Bureau, the village has a total area of 0.2 square miles (0.52 km^{2}), all land.

== Demographics ==
Historical population
Census	Pop.	Note	%±
1870	294		—
1880	289		−1.7%
1890	284		−1.7%
1900	298		4.9%
1910	289		−3.0%
1920	269		−6.9%
1930	313		16.4%
1940	296		−5.4%
1950	331		11.8%
1960	363		9.7%
1970	423		16.5%
1980	396		−6.4%
1990	272		−31.3%
2000	332		22.1%
2010	284		−14.5%
2020	272		−4.2%
U.S. Decennial Census

As of the census of 2000, there were 332 people, 126 households, and 87 families residing in the village. The population density was 1,749.7 inhabitants per square mile (675.6/km^{2}). There were 132 housing units at an average density of 695.7 per square mile (268.6/km^{2}). The racial makeup of the village was 97.59% White, 0.90% African American, 0.30% Asian, 0.90% from other races, and 0.30% from two or more races. Hispanic or Latino of any race were 0.30% of the population.

There were 126 households, out of which 38.1% had children under the age of 18 living with them, 52.4% were married couples living together, 10.3% had a female householder with no male present, and 30.2% were non-families. 27.8% of all households were made up of individuals, and 7.1% had someone living alone who was 65 years of age or older. The average household size was 2.63 and the average family size was 3.24.

In the village, the population was spread out, with 31.3% under the age of 18, 7.5% from 18 to 24, 26.2% from 25 to 44, 25.3% from 45 to 64, and 9.6% who were 65 years of age or older. The median age was 36 years. For every 100 females, there were 98.8 males. For every 100 females age 18 and over, there were 96.6 males.

The median income for a household in the village was $41,071, and the median income for a family was $50,000. Males had a median income of $31,458 versus $26,667 for females. The per capita income for the village was $19,459. About 3.7% of families and 4.8% of the population were below the poverty line, including none of those under the age of eighteen or sixty-five or over.

== Dissolution ==
On June 6, 2017, the village voted 54–12 to dissolve, becoming a part of the town of Trenton. The village had until December 3, 2017, to create a dissolution plan, with the Village Clerk stating the goal was to dissolve by the end of 2017. Barneveld was 224 years old at the time of the vote. The village was dissolved on December 31, 2017.

== Education ==
The CDP is in the Holland Patent Central School District. The municipality was located in the same school district.

== Notable people ==
- David Esterly, woodcarver, sculptor, and writer
- Richard L. Hanna, U.S. Representative from 2011 to 2017
- Adam Gerard Mappa, Dutch military commander
- François Adriaan van der Kemp, minister, Dutch Patriot, political emigre, scholar
