= Dennis Mapa =

Filipino economist and statistician

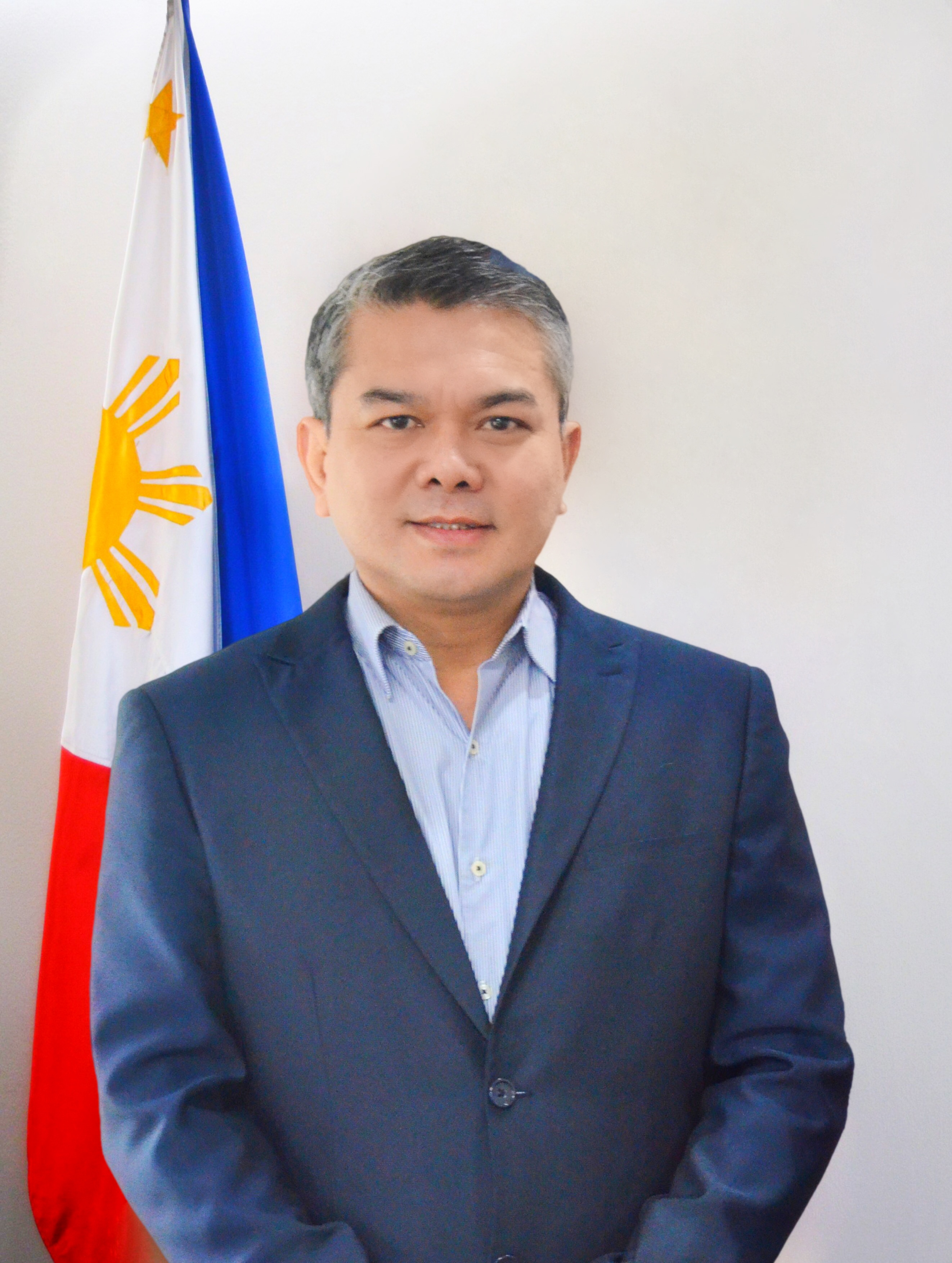

2nd National Statistician and Civil Registrar General of the Philippine Statistics Authority
- Incumbent
- Assumed office May 27, 2019
- President: Rodrigo Duterte; Bongbong Marcos
- Preceded by: Lisa Grace Bersales

Personal details
- Born: Claire Dennis Sioson Mapa; November 6, 1969 (age 56) Bacolod, Philippines
- Education: University of the Philippines School of Economics (MA, PhD), University of the Philippines School of Statistics (BS, MS)
- Alma mater: University of the Philippines
- Profession: Economist and statistician

Claire Dennis Sioson Mapa (born November 6, 1969) is a Filipino economist and statistician. He is the National Statistician and Civil Registrar General (NSCRG) of the Philippine Statistics Authority with a rank of Undersecretary as appointed by President Rodrigo Duterte. He succeeds Lisa Grace Bersales whose tenure ended on 22 April 2019.

He served as dean and professor at the School of Statistics at the University of the Philippines in Diliman, Quezon City and as the vice president and executive director of the UP Statistical Center Research Foundation.

== Early life ==
Born on November 6, 1969, in Bacolod, Negros Occidental,, Mapa obtained his bachelor's degree in statistics at the University of the Philippines School of Statistics in 1990.

After teaching for two years at the University of Negros Occidental – Recoletos, he went back to the UP School of Statistics to be an instructor and enrolled in Master of Science in statistics. mid-way through his graduate studies, he pursued his long-time interest in economics at the UP School of Economics (UPSE). He earned his degrees in MA Economics and MS Statistics in 2002 and 2004, respectively.

He was then awarded a fellowship at the UP School of Economics, where he pursued his Ph.D. in economics in 2008.

== Career ==
Mapa is the past president of the Philippine Statistical Association, Inc. (PSAI) Board of Directors, and a member of the Social Weather Stations (SWS) Advisory Council. In addition, he served as the Dean of the UP School of Statistics from September 2014 to 2017, and was re-appointed by Former UP President Alfredo Pascual in which Mapa served his second term as Dean from 2017 to 2020. However, his second term was cut short in May 2019 when he was appointed as Undersecretary of the PSA.

He continuously serves as a resource person in capacity building undertakings in the area of econometric methods. He has conducted trainings for the technical staff of various government agencies such as the Bangko Sentral ng Pilipinas (BSP), National Economic and Development Authority (NEDA), the Population Commission (POPCOM), Department of Trade and Industry (DTI), Department of Social Welfare and Development (DSWD), Philippine Competition Commission (PCC), Philippine Statistics Authority (PSA) and the Philippine Statistical Research and Training Institute (PSRTI). He was also invited by the Senate Committee on Economic Affairs to serve as a resource speaker during their policy discussions on the country's TRAIN Law in 2018.

On May 27, 2019, Mapa was officially appointed by President Rodrigo Duterte as the second National Statistician and Civil Registrar General succeeding Lisa Grace Bersales. He will serve as the Undersecretary of the Philippine Statistics Authority for five years.

On May 30, 2024, the Presidential Communications Group announced Mapa's reappointment by the President as PSA national statistician and civil registrar general, extending his term for another five years.

=== Work in the Philippine Statistics Authority ===
Mapa is heading the Philippine Statistics Authority (PSA). Among the programs implemented by the agency include the Philippine Identification System (PhilSys) and the Community-Based Monitoring System (CBMS).

The PSA is also set to conduct of the Census of Population and Housing (CPH) in May 2020.

In addition to the PhilSys and the CBMS, Mapa's leadership has set three goals for the PSA: to harmonize all official statistics reported by the PSA, to introduce new techniques and technologies in statistics (NTTS), and to urgently address the issues concerning the Civil Registration.

== Awards and recognition ==
Mapa has been awarded the One UP Professorial Chair (2016–2018; 2019–2021), the Bangko Sentral ng Pilipinas (BSP) Sterling Professor in Government and Official Statistics (2014, 2016, 2017, 2018 and 2019), the Southeast Asian Regional Center for Graduate Study and Research in Agriculture (SEARCA) Regional Professorial Chair for poverty research (2015), and the UP Centennial Professorial Chair (2011).

He is also the 2008 National Academy of Science and Technology (NAST) Outstanding Young Scientist in the field of economics. He was a visiting scholar at the International Centre for the Study of East Asian Development (ICSEAD) in Japan, the Gross National Happiness Commission of Bhutan and the Federal Institute for Vocational Education and Training (BIBB) in Germany.

His research in the areas of poverty analysis, household savings, fertility, population dynamics, measuring market risk, and forecasting methods for volatility has won awards from the NAST. This includes the Best Scientific Paper Award in 2007, 2010, and 2011 and the Best Scientific Poster Award in 2009, 2010, and 2011.

== Published research ==
He has written chapters for nationally and internationally published books and monographs in the areas of population, poverty and hunger, youth unemployment, and energy. He has also written for The Philippine Statistician, The Philippine Review of Economics, The Philippine Journal of Development, and the Asian Economic Journal, among others. He has been involved in more than 40 research undertakings, mostly involving policy researches in both public and private sectors.
