= American Home Missionary Society =

US religious organisation

The American Home Missionary Society (AHMS or A. H. M. Society) was a Protestant missionary society in the United States founded in 1826. It was founded as a merger of the United Domestic Missionary Society with state missionary societies from New England. The society was formed by members of the Presbyterian, Congregational, Associate Reformed, and Dutch Reformed churches with the objective "to assist congregations that are unable to support the gospel ministry, and to send the gospel to the destitute within the United States." In 1893, the Society became exclusively associated with the National Council of Congregational Churches and was renamed the Congregational Home Missionary Society.

== Structure ==
The structure (as described in 1858) consisted of a President, Treasurer, Recording Secretary, an Auditor, and three corresponding Secretaries.

== Associated people ==
- George H. Atkinson — AHMS missionary and educator; he and his family settled in settled at Oregon City, Oregon in 1849 as the first Oregon missionary sent by the American Home Missionary Society
- Rev. Milton Badger, a minister in Andover, Massachusetts who was associate secretary of the AHMS in the 1850s.
- Charles Beecher — Son of Lyman Beecher and Brother of Henry Ward Beecher, started 2nd Presbyterian Church in Fort Wayne Indiana under funding from AHMS
- Caroline G. Boughton - Educator and social activist from Philadelphia
- David B. Coe (pastor) — AHMS Corresponding Secretary in 1858
- Obed Dickinson and Charlotte Dickinson
- John Waldo Douglas — American Presbyterian minister (ordained in 1848) from New York who spent a brief time in the 1850s as an AHMS missionary to California prior to the Civil War.
- Ira Hobart Evans — Texas businessman and onetime AHMS President.
- Reuben Gaylord — AHMS missionary in Iowa (after 1840) and Nebraska (1855-); was the recognized leader of the missionary pioneers in the Nebraska Territory, and has been called the "father of Congregationalism in Nebraska."
- Jonathan Clarkson Gibbs — African-American abolitionist and AHMS missionary from Philadelphia who moved to North and South Carolina during the Reconstruction era.
- Martha Seavey Hoyt - biographer, newspaper correspondent, businesswoman
- Eleazar Lord — Businessman in New York City who was an early organizer and first corresponding secretary of the AHMS. He wrote the first annual report of this society.
- Daniel P. Noyes — AHMS Corresponding Secretary 1858.
- William Patton — New York city pastor and a member of the AHMS executive committee for forty years during the mid 1800s
- Agnes Louise Lesslie Peck — wife of Vermont General Theodore S. Peck; she was active in AHMS
- Anson Green Phelps — Businessman and philanthropist who contributed large sums to the AHMS
- Stephen Van Rensselaer — AHMS President in the 1820s.
- John Jay Shipherd — New-York born clergyman who moved to Elyria, Ohio in 1830 as an AHMS missionary, and soon after co-founded Oberlin College in Oberlin, Ohio in 1833 with Philo Penfield Stewart. In 1844, Shipherd also founded Olivet College in Olivet, Michigan.
- Josiah Strong — American Protestant clergyman, organizer, editor, author, and a leader of the Social Gospel movement. In 1885 AHMS published his controversial book: Our Country: Its Possible Future and Its Present Crisis.

== Associated churches ==
- First Congregational Church (Salt Lake City, Utah)—Established in 1865, it was the first church not a part of the Church of Jesus Christ of Latter-day Saints (LDS Church) in Utah. The congregation started Utah's first free public schools. Started by AHMS missionary Norman McLeod.
- First Presbyterian Church (Chicago) - this was the first (and therefore oldest) religious society in Chicago. The first public school in Chicago was organized in the meeting house of the First Presbyterian Church, and Eliza Chappel was the first teacher in this school. The church was established by AHMS missionary Jeremiah Porter on June 26, 1833 in Chicago.

== See also ==
- American Board of Commissioners for Foreign Missions
- American Missionary Association
- Plan of Union of 1801

== Bibliography ==
- Horvath, David G. "American Home Missionary Society". amistadresearchcenter.tulane.edu. Amistad Research Center. Archived from the original on December 27, 2019.
- Otis, Philo Adams (1900). The First Presbyterian Church: a history of the oldest organization in Chicago : with biographical sketches of the pastors and copious extracts from the choir records (Public domain ed.). C.F. Summy Co. p. 4.
- Otis, Philo Adams (1913). The First Presbyterian Church (Public domain ed.). Chicago: F.H. Revell Co. p. 22. ISBN 978-5-88230-217-6.
