= Mappa Hall =

Historic house in New York, United States

- U.S. National Register of Historic Places
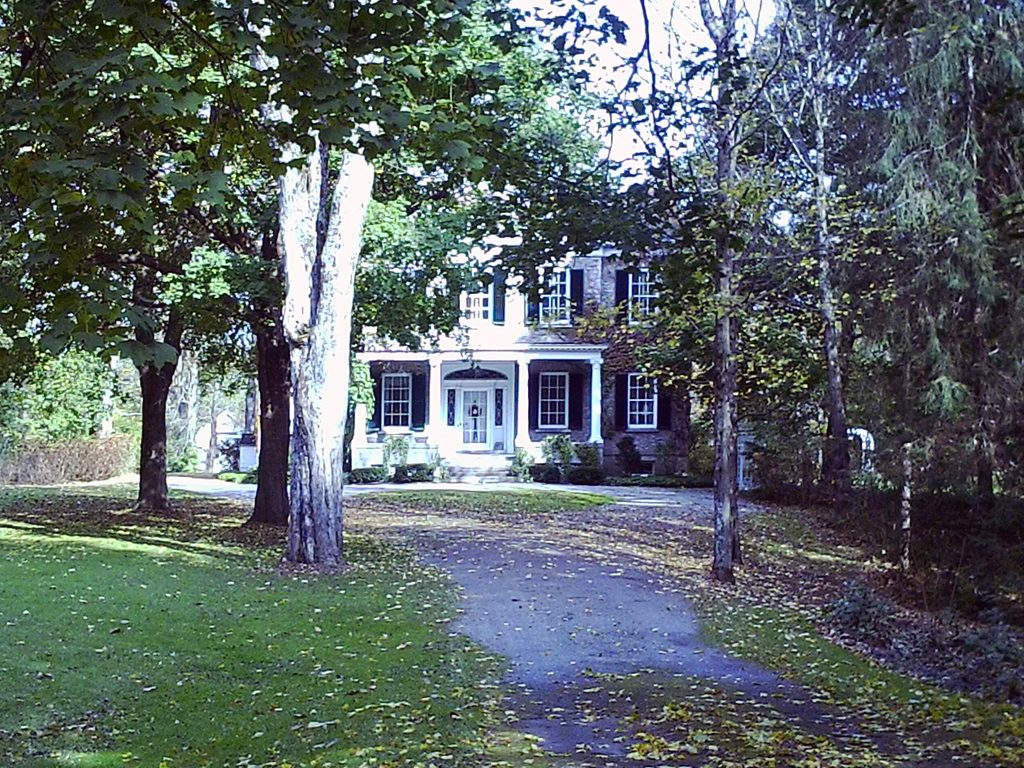
- Mappa Hall, Front View

- Location within New York Location within the United States
- Location: Mappa Ave., Barneveld, New York
- Coordinates: 43°16′23″N 75°11′22″W
- Area: 3 acres (1.2 ha)
- Built: 1801-1809
- Architect: Mappa, Adam Gerard
- Architectural style: Federal
- NRHP reference No.: 82003388
- Added to NRHP: May 12, 1982

Mappa Hall is a historic home located in Barneveld in Oneida County, New York. It was built 1801-1809 and is a two-story limestone structure in the Federal style. It features a projecting, three bay pavilion surmounted by a pediment with modillion cornice and a single story portico. It was the home of Adam Gerard Mappa, but it is now the home of Susie and Lees Divine.

It was listed on the National Register of Historic Places in 1982.

Views of Mappa Hall
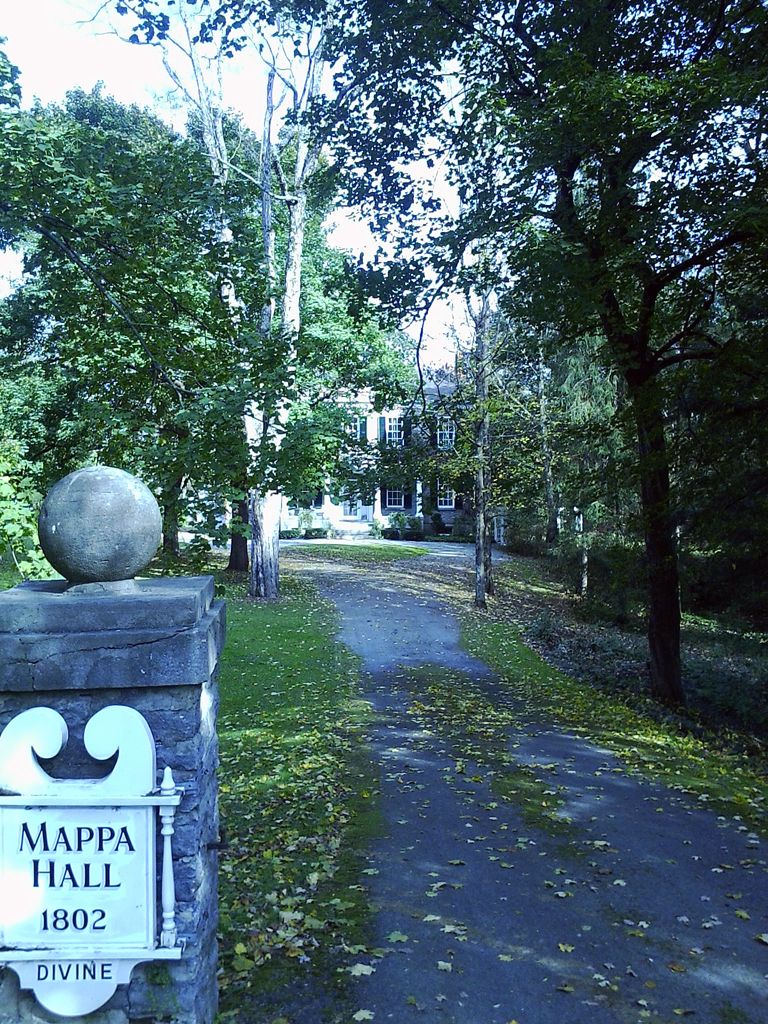
Front View of Mappa Hall and Grounds with Sign.

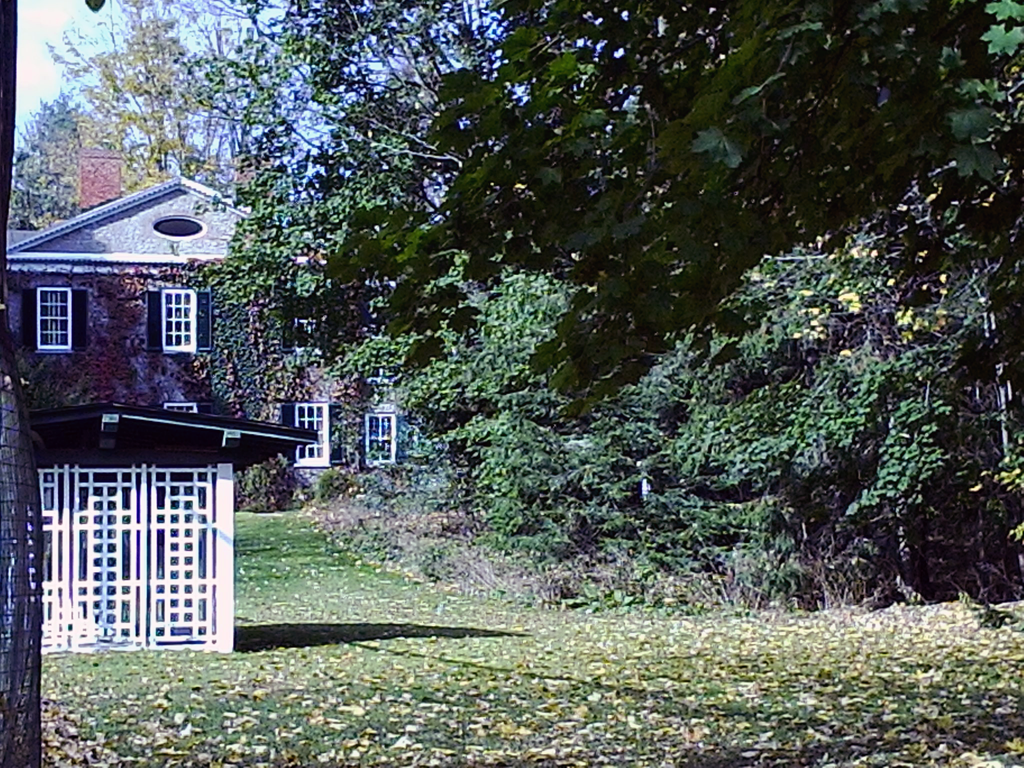
Side View of Mappa Hall.

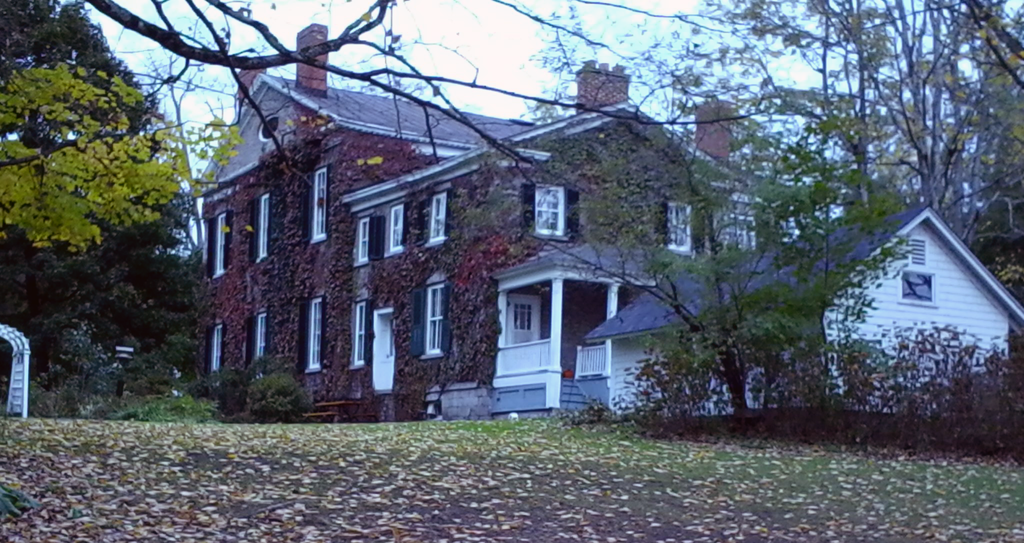
Back of Mappa Hall.
