= William Patton (preacher) =

American pastor and abolitionist (1798–1879)

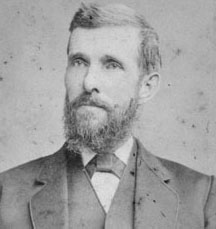
- Born: August 23, 1798; New Haven, Connecticut, U.S.
- Died: September 9, 1879 (aged 81); Philadelphia, Pennsylvania, U.S.
- Education: Middlebury College
- Relatives: William Weston Patton (son); Robert M. Patton (father)

William Patton (August 23, 1798 – September 9, 1879), was a pastor and abolitionist. He was the son of Revolutionary War colonel and the first Postmaster of Philadelphia Robert Patton. He was married to Mary and was the father of the abolitionist William Weston Patton.

== Career ==
He graduated at Middlebury College in 1818, and, after studying at Princeton theological seminary, was ordained in 1820. During twenty-six years of his life he was pastor of churches in New York city. From 1834 to 1837, he was secretary of the American Education Society. He spent the latter part of his life in New Haven, Connecticut, engaged in literary and ministerial work. He was the first to suggest the idea of the World Evangelical Alliance, which he did in a letter to Rev John Angell James, of England, in 1843.

He attended the convention in London in August 1846, that organized the alliance. He was a founder of the Union Theological Seminary, and served as director between 1836 and 1849. He made fourteen visits to Europe between 1825 and 1879 first for health and afterwards as a delegate to religious organizations. He was an earnest opponent of slavery, and for forty years a member of the executive committee of the American Home Missionary Society. His views on the subject of temperance were equally radical.

In the pulpit he was characterized not so much by breadth and accuracy of scholarship, finish of style, or elegance of delivery, as by his strong grasp upon his subject, his simplicity, directness, aptness, and freshness. He received the degree of D. D. from the University of the City of New York.

== Publications ==
Patton edited President Jonathan Edwards' work on "Revivals" and Charles G. Finney's "Lectures on Revivals" (London, 1839), preparing the American editions of The Cottage Bible, of which over 170,000 copies were sold, and The Village Testament (New York, 1833), and assisting in editing The Christian Psalmist (1836).

He also published The Laws of Fermentation and the Wines of the Ancients (1871); The Judgment of Jerusalem, Predicted in Scripture, Fulfilled in History (London, 1879); Jesus of Nazareth (1878); and Bible Principles and Bible Characters (Hartford, 1879).
