= Remsen (village), New York =

Remsen, New York
- Village
- Flag
- Nickname: Remsen City
- Motto: "Set in rural Welsh tradition"
- Location in Oneida County and the state of New York.
- Coordinates: 43°19′39″N 75°11′12″W
- Country: United States
- State: New York
- County: Oneida
- Town: Remsen, Trenton
- Village: 1845

Area
  - Total: 0.37 sq mi (0.96 km^{2})
  - Land: 0.37 sq mi (0.96 km^{2})
  - Water: 0 sq mi (0.00 km^{2})
- Elevation: 1,184 ft (361 m)

Population (2020)
  - Total: 431
  - Density: 1,157.6/sq mi (446.96/km^{2})
- Time zone: UTC-5 (Eastern (EST))
  - Summer (DST): UTC-4 (EDT)
- ZIP code: 13438
- Area code: 315
- FIPS code: 36-61115
- GNIS feature ID: 2391090
- Website: villageremsen.digitaltowpath.org:10043/content

Remsen is a village in Oneida County, New York, United States. The population was 431 at the 2020 census. The village is in the southwestern part of the town of Remsen.

The Remsen Barn Festival of the Arts (FOTA) is held in late September. The first Barn Festival was in 1980. Thousands of visitors attend this yearly event on Main street.

The Mohawk, Adirondack and Northern Railroad (MHWA) Railroad crosses the town. The Adirondack Scenic Railroad utilizes the MHWA's trackage from Utica to just north of the village, diverting onto its own trackage (former NYC Adirondack Division)

== History ==
Oneida County was formed and the town of Remsen was organized on March 15, 1798. The village of Remsen was incorporated in 1845. The town was divided to create the town of Forestport on November 24, 1869.

== Geography ==
Remsen is located at 43°19′39″N 75°11′12″W (43.327589, -75.186734).

According to the United States Census Bureau, the village has a total area of 0.4 square mile (1.0 km^{2}), all land. Cincinnati Creek flows through the village from north to south.

== Demographics ==
Historical population
Census	Pop.	Note	%±
1870	289		—
1890	358		—
1900	389		8.7%
1910	421		8.2%
1920	448		6.4%
1930	437		−2.5%
1940	422		−3.4%
1950	483		14.5%
1960	567		17.4%
1970	602		6.2%
1980	621		3.2%
1990	518		−16.6%
2000	531		2.5%
2010	508		−4.3%
2020	431		−15.2%
U.S. Decennial Census

At the 2000 census, there were 431 people, 202 households and 136 families residing in the village. The population density was 1,431.9 inhabitants per square mile (552.9/km^{2}). There were 229 housing units at an average density of 617.5 per square mile (238.4/km^{2}). The racial makeup of the village was 97.18% White, 0.75% Black or African American, 0.19% Native American, 0.75% Asian, and 1.13% from two or more races. Hispanic or Latino of any race were 0.19% of the population.

There were 202 households, of which 36.1% had children under the age of 18 living with them, 49.0% were married couples living together, 15.8% had a female householder with no male present, and 32.2% were non-families. 24.3% of all households were made up of individuals, and 10.4% had someone living alone who was 65 years of age or older. The average household size was 2.63 and the average family size was 3.12.

27.7% of the population were under the age of 18, 12.2% from 18 to 24, 27.9% from 25 to 44, 22.6% from 45 to 64, and 9.6% who were 65 years of age or older. The median age was 32 years. For every 100 females, there were 88.3 males. For every 100 females age 18 and over, there were 94.9 males.

The median household income was $29,485 and the median family income was $32,625. Males had a median income of $27,083 versus $23,750 for females. The per capita income for the village was $12,625. About 17.5% of families and 19.0% of the population were below the poverty line, including 22.1% of those under age 18 and 13.7% of those age 65 or over.

== Education ==
It is in the Remsen Central School District.
