= History of Massachusetts =

Flag of Massachusetts

The area that is now Massachusetts was colonized by English settlers in the early 17th century and became the Commonwealth of Massachusetts in the 18th century. Before that, it was inhabited by a variety of Native American tribes. Massachusetts is named after the Massachusett tribe that inhabited the area of present-day Greater Boston. The Pilgrim Fathers who sailed on the Mayflower established the first permanent settlement in 1620 at Plymouth Colony which set precedents but never grew large. A large-scale Puritan migration began in 1630 with the establishment of the Massachusetts Bay Colony, and that spawned the settlement of other New England colonies.

As the colony grew, businessmen established wide-ranging trade, sending ships to the West Indies and Europe. Britain began to increase taxes on the New England colonies, and tensions grew with implementation of the Navigation Acts. These political and trade issues led to the revocation of the Massachusetts charter in 1684. The king established the Dominion of New England in 1686 to govern all of New England, and to centralize royal control and weaken local government. Sir Edmund Andros's intensely unpopular rule came to a sudden end in 1689 with an uprising sparked by the Glorious Revolution in England. The new king William III established the Province of Massachusetts Bay in 1691 to govern a territory roughly equivalent to the modern states of Massachusetts and Maine. Its governors were appointed by the Crown, unlike the predecessor colonies that had elected their own governors. This increased friction between the colonists and the Crown, which reached its height in the days leading up to the American Revolution in the 1760s and 1770s over the question of who could levy taxes. The American Revolutionary War began in Massachusetts in 1775 when London tried to shut down American self-government.

The commonwealth formally adopted the state constitution in 1780, electing John Hancock as its first governor. In the 19th century, New England became America's center of manufacturing with the development of precision manufacturing and weaponry in Springfield and Hartford, Connecticut, and large-scale textile mill complexes in Worcester, Haverhill, Lowell, and other communities throughout New England using their rivers for power. New England also was an intellectual center and center of abolitionism. The Springfield Armory made most of the weaponry for the Union in the American Civil War. After the war, immigrants from Europe, The Middle East and Asia flooded into Massachusetts, continuing to expand its industrial base until the 1950s when textiles and other industries started to fade away, leaving a "rust belt" of empty mills and factories. Labor unions were important after the 1860s, as was big-city politics. The state's strength as a center of education contributed to the development of an economy based on information technology and biotechnology in the later years of the 20th century, leading to the "Massachusetts Miracle" of the late 1980s.

== Before European settlement ==
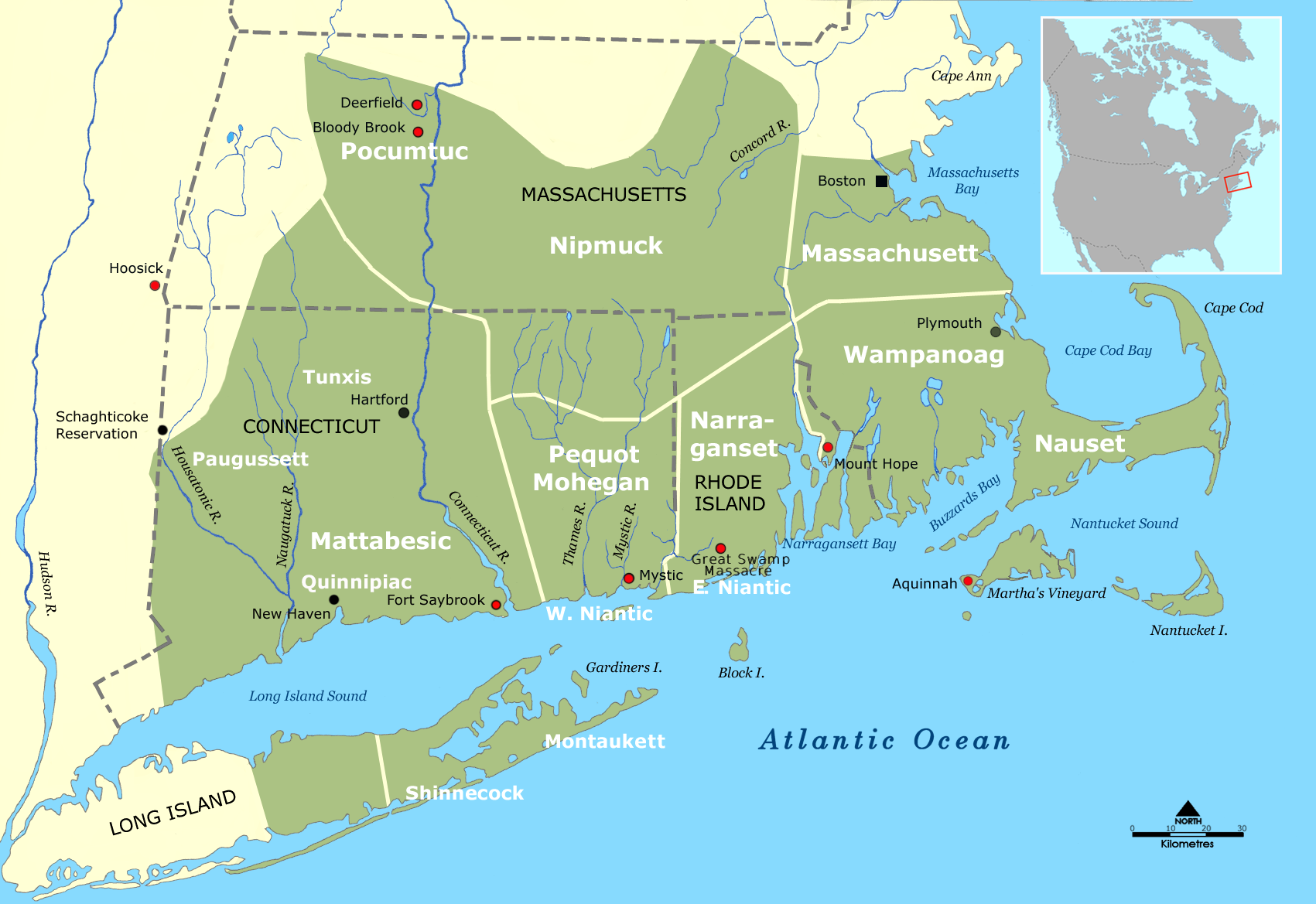
Map of southern New England indicating approximate ranges of Native American tribes circa 1600. Massachusetts is named after the Massachusett tribe.

Massachusetts was originally inhabited by tribes of the Algonquian language family such as the Wampanoag, Narragansetts, Nipmucs, Pocomtucs, Mahicans, and Massachusetts. The Vermont and New Hampshire borders and the Merrimack River valley was the traditional home of the Pennacook tribe. Cape Cod, Nantucket, Martha's Vineyard, and southeast Massachusetts were the home of the Wampanoags who established a close bond with the Pilgrim Fathers. The extreme end of the Cape was inhabited by the closely related Nauset tribe. Much of the central portion and the Connecticut River valley was home to the loosely organized Nipmucs. The Berkshires were the home of both the Pocomtuc and the Mahican tribes. Narragansetts from Rhode Island and Mahicans from Connecticut Colony were also present.

These tribes were generally dependent on hunting and fishing for most of their food supply. Villages consisted of lodges called wigwams as well as long houses, and tribes were led by male or female elders known as sachems. Europeans began exploring the coast in the 16th century, but they made few attempts at permanent settlement anywhere. Early European explorers of the New England coast included Bartholomew Gosnold who named Cape Cod in 1602, Samuel de Champlain who charted the northern coast as far as Cape Cod in 1605 and 1606, John Smith, and Henry Hudson. Fishing ships from Europe also worked in the rich waters off the coast, and may have traded with some of the tribes. Large numbers of Native people were decimated by virgin soil epidemics, perhaps including smallpox, measles, influenza, or leptospirosis. In 1617–1619, a disease killed 90 percent of the native population in the region.

== Pilgrims and Puritans: 1620–1629 ==
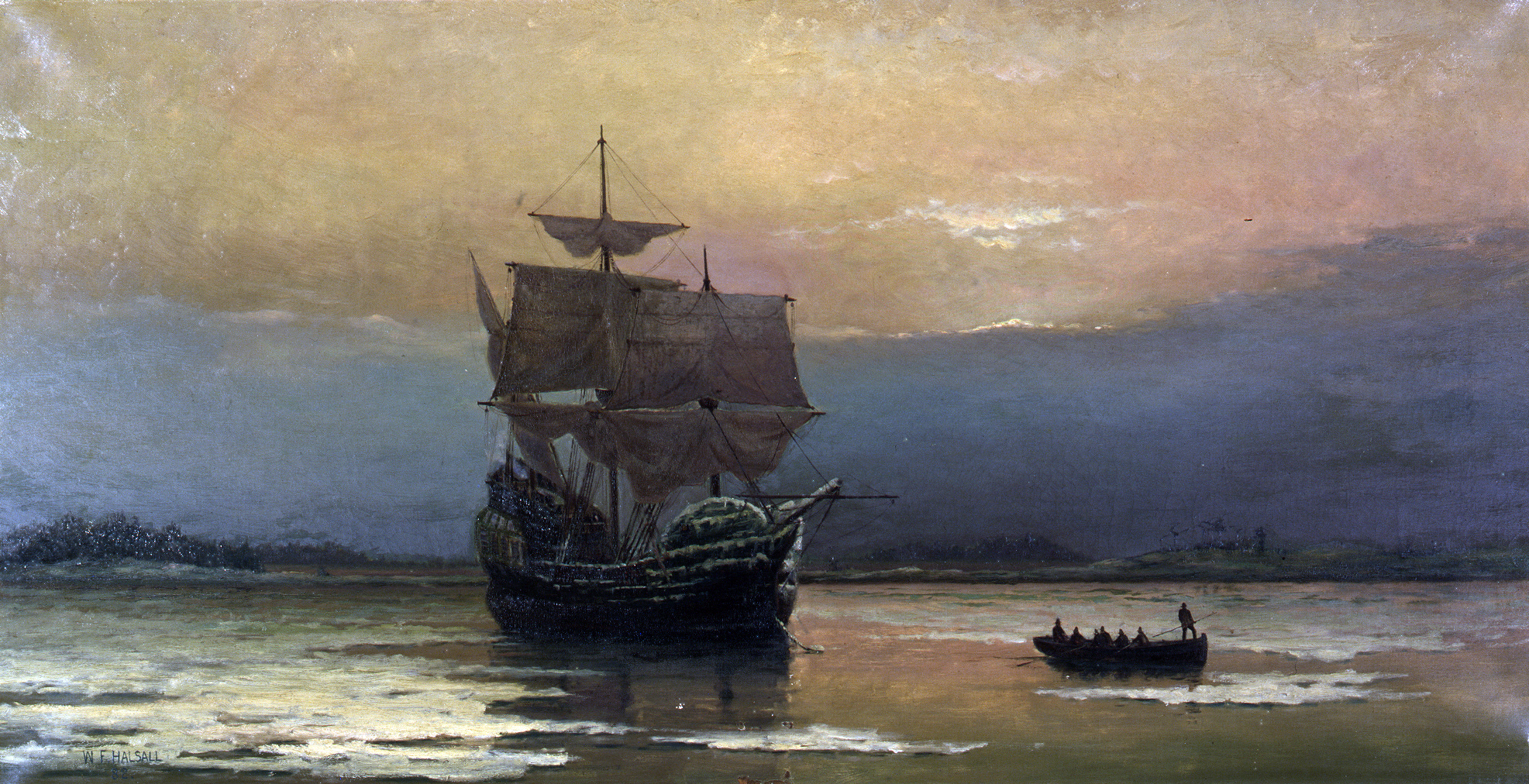
Mayflower in Plymouth Harbor by William Halsall (1882)

The first settlers in Massachusetts were the Pilgrims who established Plymouth Colony in 1620 and developed friendly relations with the Wampanoag people. This was the second permanent English colony in America following Jamestown Colony. The Pilgrims had migrated from England to Holland to escape religious persecution for rejecting England's official church. They were allowed religious liberty in Holland, but they gradually became concerned that the next generation would lose their distinct English heritage. They approached the Virginia Company and asked to settle "as a distinct body of themselves" in America. In the fall of 1620, they sailed to America on the Mayflower, first landing near Provincetown at the tip of Cape Cod. The area did not lie within their charter, so the Pilgrims created the Mayflower Compact before landing, one of America's first documents of self-governance. The first year was extremely difficult, with inadequate supplies and very harsh weather, but Wampanoag sachem Massasoit and his people assisted them.

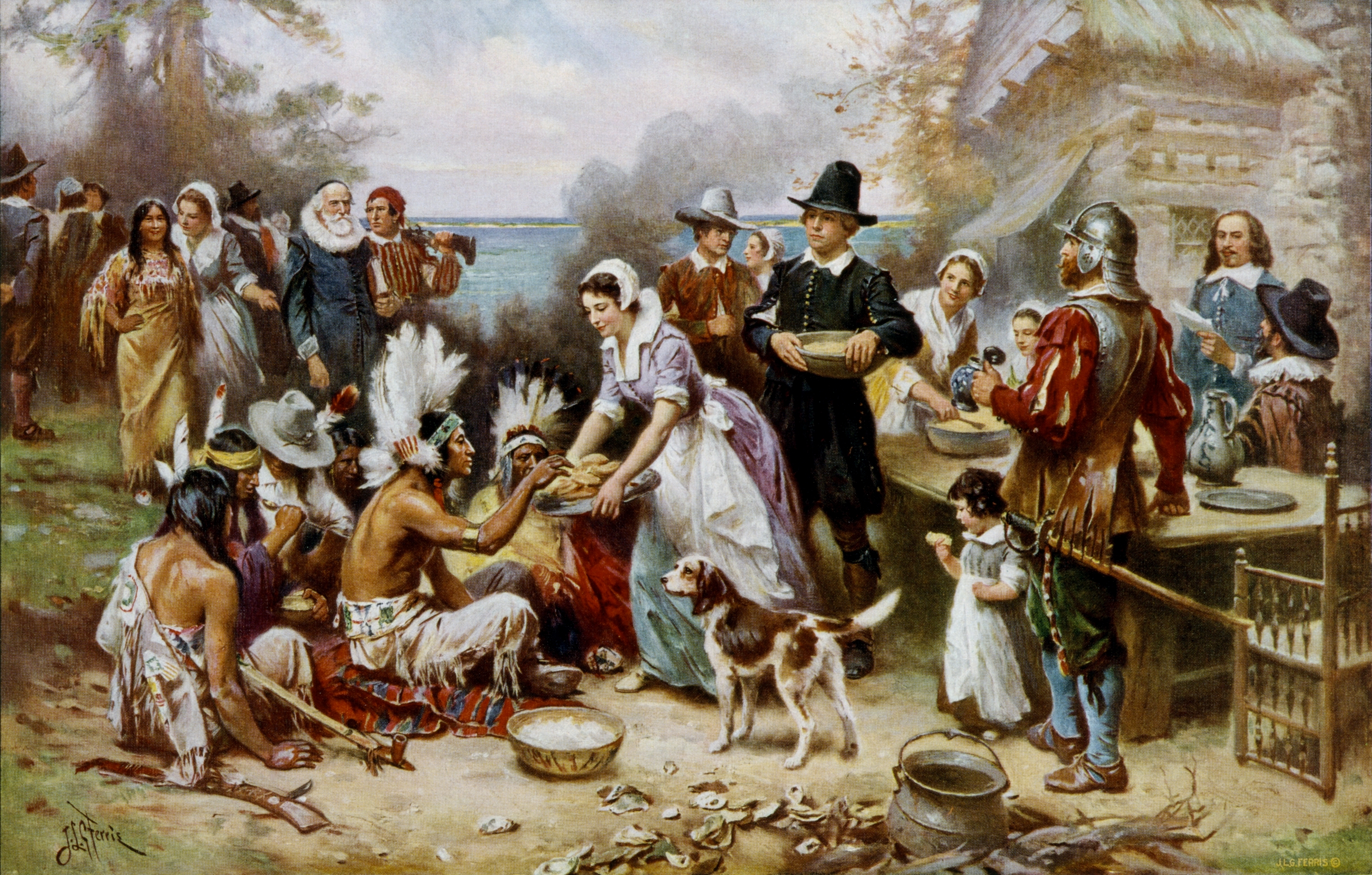
The First Thanksgiving 1621

In 1621, the Pilgrims celebrated their first Thanksgiving Day together to thank God for the blessings of good harvest and survival. This Thanksgiving came to represent the peace that existed at that time between the Wampanoags and the Pilgrims, although only about half of the Mayflower company survived the first year. The colony grew slowly over the next ten years, and was estimated to have 300 inhabitants by 1630.

A group of fur-trappers and traders established Wessagusset Colony near the Plymouth colony in Weymouth in 1622. They abandoned it in 1623, and it was replaced by another small colony led by Robert Gorges. This settlement also failed, and individuals from these colonies returned to England, joined the Plymouth colonists, or established individual outposts elsewhere on the shores of Massachusetts Bay. In 1624, the Dorchester Company established a settlement on Cape Ann. This colony only survived until 1626, although a few settlers remained.

== Massachusetts Bay Colony: 1628–1686 ==
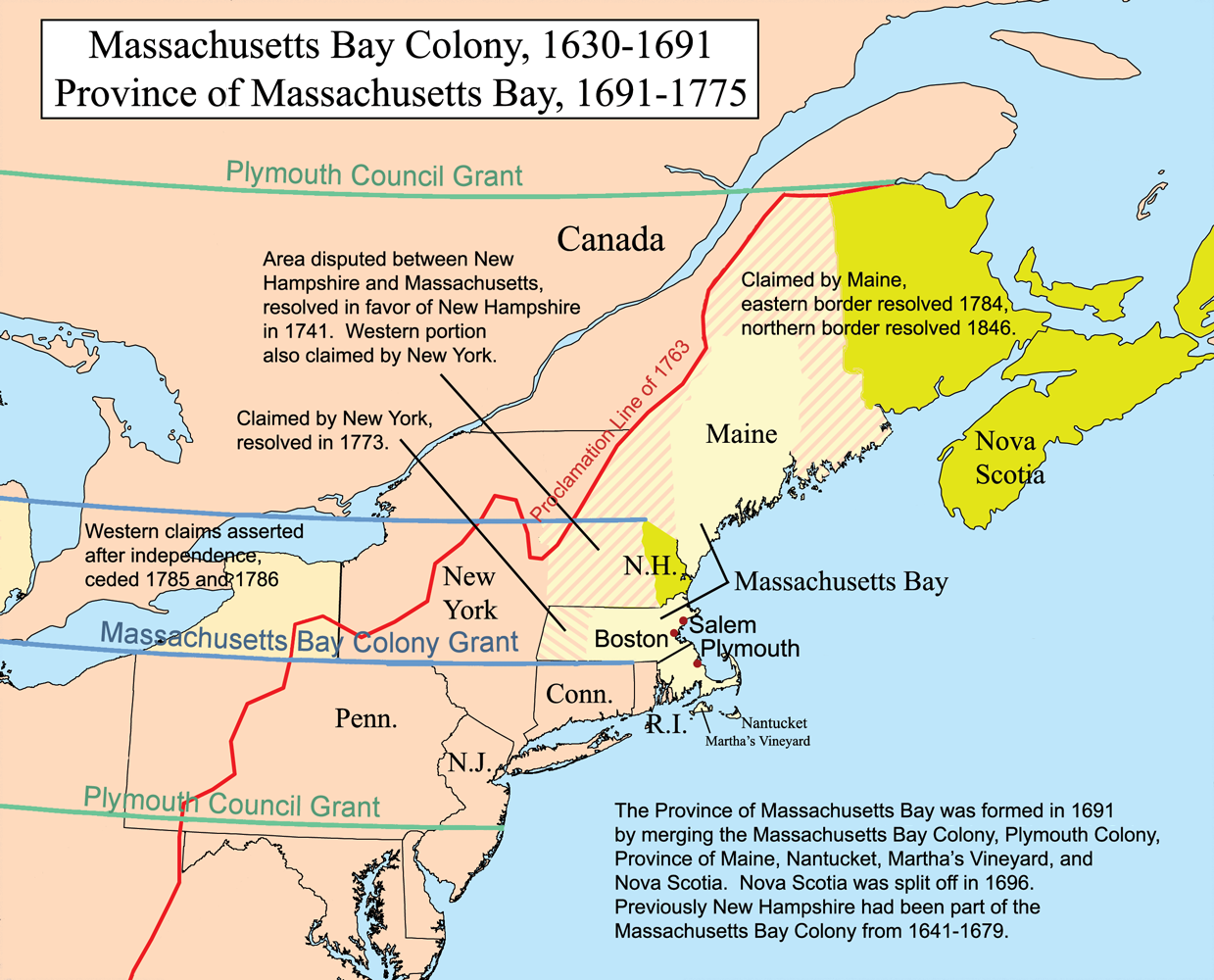
Major boundaries of Massachusetts Bay and neighboring colonial claims in the 17th century and 18th century; modern state boundaries are partially overlaid for context

The Pilgrims were followed by Puritans who established the Massachusetts Bay Colony at Salem (1629) and Boston (1630). The Puritans strongly dissented from the theology and church polity of the Church of England, and they came to Massachusetts for religious freedom. The Bay Colony was founded under a royal charter, unlike Plymouth Colony. The Puritan migration was mainly from East Anglia and southwestern regions of England, with an estimated 20,000 immigrants between 1628 and 1642. Massachusetts Bay colony quickly eclipsed Plymouth in population and economy, the chief factors being the large influx of population, more suitable harbor facilities for trade, and the growth of a prosperous merchant class.

Religious dissension and expansionism led to the founding of several new colonies shortly after Plymouth and Massachusetts Bay. Dissenters such as Roger Williams and Anne Hutchinson were banished due to religious disagreements with Massachusetts Bay authorities. Williams established Providence Plantations in 1636. Over the next few years, another group, which included Hutchinson, established Newport and Portsmouth; these settlements eventually joined to form the Colony of Rhode Island and Providence Plantations. Others left Massachusetts Bay in order to establish other settlements, including Connecticut Colony on the Connecticut River and New Haven Colony on the coast.

In 1636, a group of settlers led by William Pynchon founded Springfield, Massachusetts (originally named Agawam), after scouting for the region's most advantageous location for trading and farming. Springfield is located just north of the first of Connecticut River's unnavigable waterfalls, and it also sits amid the fertile valley which contains New England's best agricultural land. The Indian tribes surrounding Springfield were friendly, which was not always the case for the fledgling Connecticut colonies. Pynchon annexed Springfield to the Massachusetts Bay Colony in 1640 rather than the much closer Connecticut Colony over tensions with Connecticut following the Pequot War. Massachusetts Bay Colony's southern and western borders were thus established in 1640.

King Philip's War (1675–76) was the bloodiest Indian war of the colonial period. In little over a year, Indians attacked nearly half of the region's towns, and they burned to the ground the major settlements at Providence and Springfield. New England's economy was all but ruined, and much of its population was killed. Proportionately, it was one of the bloodiest and costliest wars in the history of North America.

In 1645, the General Court ordered rural towns to increase sheep production. Sheep provided meat and especially wool for the local cloth industry, avoiding the expense of imports of British cloth. In 1652, the General Court authorized Boston silversmith John Hull to produce local coinage in shilling, sixpence and threepence denominations to address a coin shortage in the colony. To that point, the colony's economy had been entirely dependent on barter and foreign currency, including English, Spanish, Dutch, Portuguese and counterfeit coins.

Charles II was restored to the throne in 1660 and began to scrutinize the governmental oversight in the colonies. He sent over the Carr-Cartwright Commission and Parliament passed the Navigation Acts to regulate trade for England's benefit. Massachusetts and Rhode Island had thriving merchant fleets, and they often ran afoul of the trade regulations. Partially in an attempt to weaken Massachusetts, King Charles II partitioned off the northern counties to form the Province of New Hampshire in 1679.The English government also considered the Boston mint to be treasonous. However, the colony ignored the English demands to cease mint operations until at least 1682. King Charles formally vacated the Massachusetts charter in 1684.

== Dominion of New England: 1686–1692 ==
In 1660, King Charles II was restored to the throne. Colonial matters brought to his attention led him to propose the amalgamation of all of the New England colonies into a single administrative unit. In 1685, he was succeeded by James II, an outspoken Catholic who implemented the proposal. In June 1684, the charter of the Massachusetts Bay Colony was annulled, but its government continued to rule until James appointed Joseph Dudley to the new post of President of New England in 1686. Dudley established his authority later in New Hampshire and the King's Province (part of current Rhode Island), maintaining this position until Sir Edmund Andros arrived to become the Royal Governor of the Dominion of New England. The rule of Andros was unpopular. He ruled without a representative assembly, vacated land titles, restricted town meetings, enforced the Navigation Acts, and promoted the Church of England, angering virtually every segment of Massachusetts colonial society. Andros dealt a major blow to the colonists by challenging their title to the land; unlike England the great majority of New Englanders were land-owners. Taylor says that because they "regarded secure real estate as fundamental to their liberty, status, and prosperity, the colonists felt horrified by the sweeping and expensive challenge to their land titles."

After James II was overthrown by William III and Mary II in late 1688, Boston colonists overthrew Andros and his officials in 1689. Both Massachusetts and Plymouth returned to their previous governments until 1692. During King William's War (1689–1697), the colony launched an unsuccessful expedition against Quebec under Sir William Phips in 1690, which had been financed by issuing paper bonds set against the gains expected from taking the city. The colony continued to be on the front lines of the war, and experienced widespread French and Indian raids on its northern and western frontiers.

== Royal Province of Massachusetts Bay: 1692–1774 ==
In 1691, William and Mary chartered the Province of Massachusetts Bay, combining the territories of Massachusetts Bay, Plymouth, Maine, Nova Scotia (which then included New Brunswick), and the islands south of Cape Cod. For its first governor they chose Sir William Phips. Phips came to Boston in 1692 to begin his rule, and was immediately thrust into the witchcraft hysteria in Salem. He established the court that heard the notorious Salem witch trials, and oversaw the war effort until he was recalled in 1694.

=== Economy ===
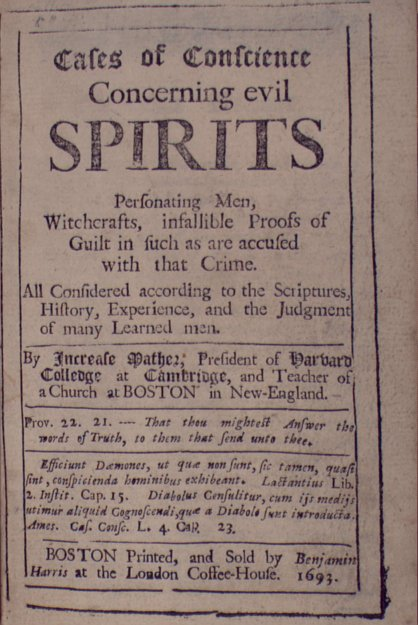
Concerning Evil Spirits (Boston, 1693) by Increase Mather

The province was the largest and most economically important in New England, and one where many American institutions and traditions were formed. Unlike southern colonies, it was built around small towns rather than scattered farms. The westernmost portion of Massachusetts, the Berkshires, was settled during the three decades following the end of the French and Indian War, largely by Scots. Sir Francis Bernard, the Royal Governor, named this new area "Berkshire" after his home county in England. The largest settlement in Berkshire County was Pittsfield, Massachusetts, founded in 1761.

The educational system, headed by Harvard College, was the best in the 13 colonies. Newspapers became a major communications system in the 18th century, with Boston taking a leading role in the British colonies. Teenaged Benjamin Franklin (born January 17, 1706, in Milk Street) worked on one of the earliest newspapers, The New-England Courant (owned by his brother) until he ran away to Philadelphia in 1723. Five Boston newspapers presented a full range of opinions during the coming of the American revolution. In Worcester, printer Isaiah Thomas made the Massachusetts Spy the influential voice of the western settlers.

Farming was the largest economic activity. Most farming towns were largely self-sufficient, with families trading with each other for items they did not produce themselves; the surplus was sold to cities. and Fishing was important in coastal towns like Marblehead. Great quantities of cod were exported to the slave colonies in the West Indies. Merchant trade was based in Salem and Boston, and numerous wealthy merchants traded internationally. They typically stationed their sons and nephews as agents in ports around the empire. Their business grew dramatically after 1783 when they no longer were confined to the British Empire. Shipbuilding was a fast-growing industry. Most other manufactured products were imported from Britain (or smuggled in from the Netherlands).

==== Banking ====
In 1690, the Massachusetts Bay Colony became the first to issue paper money in what would become the United States, but soon others began printing their own money as well. The demand for currency in the colonies was due to the scarcity of coins, which had been the primary means of trade. Colonies' paper currencies were used to pay for their expenses and lend money to the colonies' citizens. Paper money quickly became the primary means of exchange within each colony, and it even began to be used in financial transactions with other colonies. However, some of the currencies were not redeemable in gold or silver, which caused them to depreciate. With the Currency Act of 1751, the British parliament limited the ability of the New England colonies to issue fiat paper currency. Under the 1751 act, the New England colonial governments could make paper money legal tender for the payment of public debts (such as taxes), and could issue bills of credit as a tool of government finance, but barred the use of paper money as legal tender for private debts. Under continued pressure from the British merchant-creditors who disliked being paid in depreciated paper currency, the subsequent Currency Act of 1764 banned the issuance of bills of credit (paper money) throughout the colonies. Colonial governments used workarounds to accept paper notes as payment for taxes and pressured Parliament to repeal the prohibition on paper money as legal tender for public debts, which Parliament ultimately did in 1773.

The colony was always short of gold and silver and printed a great deal of paper money, which caused inflation that favored farmers but angered business interests. By 1750, however, the colony recalled its paper currency and transitioned to a specie currency based on the British reimbursement (in gold and silver) for its spending in the French and Indian wars. The large-scale merchants and Royal officials welcomed the transition but many farmers and smaller businessmen were opposed.

=== Wars with France ===
The colony fought alongside British regulars in a series of French and Indian Wars characterized by brutal border raids and attacks by Indians organized and supplied by New France. Particularly in King William's War (1689–97) and Queen Anne's War (1702–13), the colony's rural communities were directly exposed to French and Indian attacks, with Deerfield raided in 1704 and Haverhill raided in 1708. Boston responded, launching naval expeditions against Acadia and Quebec in both wars.

During Queen Anne's War, Massachusetts men were involved in the Conquest of Acadia (1710), which became the Province of Nova Scotia. The province was also involved in Dummer's War, which drove Indian tribes from northern New England. In 1745, during King George's War, Massachusetts provincial forces successfully besieged Fortress Louisbourg. The fortress was returned to France at the end of the war, angering many colonists who viewed it as a threat to their security. During the French and Indian War, Governor William Shirley was instrumental in the Expulsion of the Acadians from Nova Scotia and trying to settle them in New England. After the expulsion, Shirley also was involved in transporting New England Planters to settle Nova Scotia on the former Acadian farms. Many troops from Massachusetts participated in the successful Siege of Havana in 1762. Britain's victory in the war led to its acquisition of New France, removing the immediate northern threat to Massachusetts that the French had posed.

=== Disasters ===
Boston was hit by a major smallpox epidemic in 1721. Some colonial leaders called for use of the new technique of inoculation, whereby a patient would get a weak form of the disease and become permanently immune. Puritan minister Cotton Mather and physician Zabdiel Boylston led the drive for inoculation, while physician William Douglass and newspaper editor James Franklin led the opposition.

In 1755, about 4:15 am on Tuesday, November 18, was the most destructive earthquake yet known in New England. The first pulsations of the ground were followed for about a minute of tremulous motion. Next came a quick vibration and several jerks much worse than the first. Houses rocked and cracked; furniture fell over. Dr. Edward A. Holyoke, of Salem, wrote in his diary that he "thought of nothing less than being buried instantly in the ruins of the house." The shaking continued for two to three minutes more, and seemed to move from northwest to southeast. The ocean along the coast was affected; ships shook so much that sleeping sailors awoke, thinking they had run aground. In Boston, the earthquake threw dishes on the floor, stopped clocks, and bent vane-rods on churches and Faneuil Hall. Stone walls collapsed. New springs appeared, and old springs dried up. Subterranean streams changed their courses, emptying many wells. The worst damage was to chimneys. In Boston alone, about a hundred were leveled; about fifteen hundred were damaged, the streets in some places almost covered with fallen bricks. Falling chimneys broke some roofs. Many wooden buildings in Boston were thrown down, and some brick buildings suffered; the gable ends of twelve or fifteen were knocked down to the eaves. Despite the danger and many narrow escapes, no one was killed or seriously injured. Aftershocks continued for four days.

=== Politics ===
The relationship between the provincial government and the crown-appointed governor was often difficult and contentious. The governors sought to assert the royal prerogatives granted in the provincial charter, and the provincial government wanted to strip or minimize the governor's power. For example, each governor was ordered to enact legislation for providing permanent salaries for crown officials, but the legislature refused to do so, using its ability to grant stipends annually as a means of control over the governor. The province's periodic issuance of paper currency was also a persistent source of friction between factions in the province, due to its inflationary effects. Notable royal governors during this period were Joseph Dudley, Thomas Hutchinson, Jonathan Belcher, Francis Bernard, and General Thomas Gage. Gage was the last British governor of Massachusetts, and his effective rule extended to little more than Boston.

== Revolutionary Massachusetts: 1760s–1780s ==
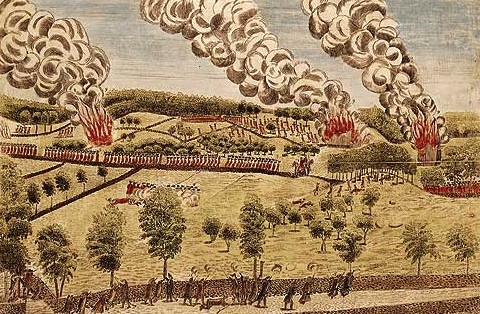
Percy's Rescue at Lexington by Ralph Earl and Amos Doolittle from 1775, an illustration of the Battles of Lexington and Concord.

Massachusetts was a center of the movement for independence from Great Britain, earning it the nickname, the "Cradle of Liberty". Colonists here had long had uneasy relations with the British monarchy, including open rebellion under the Dominion of New England in the 1680s. The Boston Tea Party is an example of the protest spirit in the early 1770s, while the Boston Massacre escalated the conflict. Anti-British activity by men like Sam Adams and John Hancock, followed by reprisals by the British government, were a primary reason for the unity of the Thirteen Colonies and the outbreak of the American Revolution. The Battles of Lexington and Concord initiated the American Revolutionary War and were fought in the Massachusetts towns of Lexington and Concord. Future President George Washington took over what would become the Continental Army after the battle. His first victory was the Siege of Boston in the winter of 1775–76, after which the British were forced to evacuate the city. The event is still celebrated in Suffolk County as Evacuation Day. In 1777, George Washington and Henry Knox founded the Arsenal at Springfield, which catalyzed many innovations in Massachusetts's Connecticut River Valley.

=== Boston Massacre ===
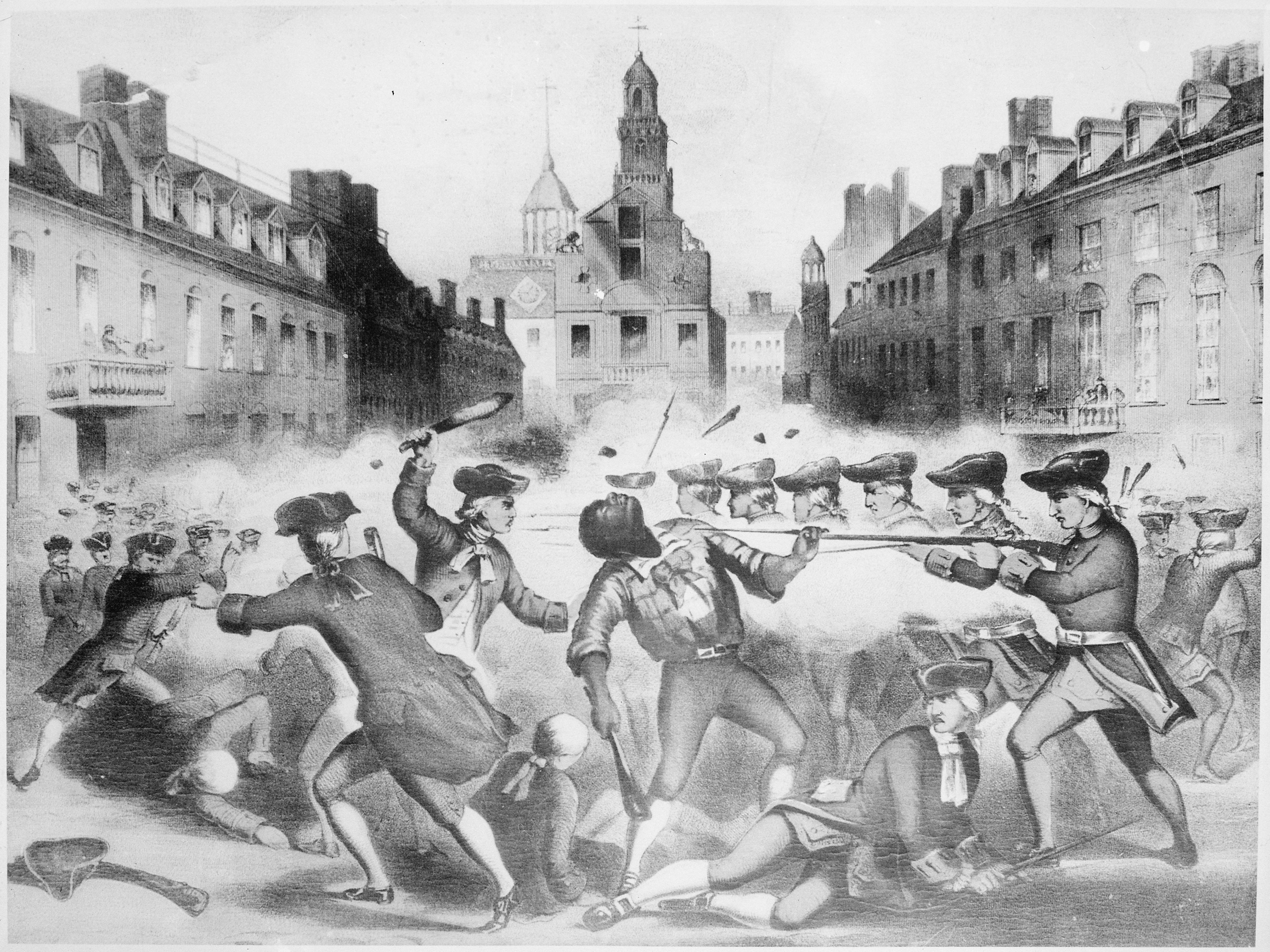
Boston Massacre

Boston was the center of revolutionary activity in the decade before 1775, with Massachusetts natives Samuel Adams, John Adams, and John Hancock as leaders who would become important in the revolution. Boston had been under military occupation since 1768. When customs officials were attacked by mobs, two regiments of British regulars arrived. They had been housed in the city with increasing public outrage.

In Boston on March 5, 1770, what began as a rock-throwing incident against a few British soldiers ended in the shooting of five men by British soldiers in what became known as the Boston Massacre. The incident caused further anger against British authority in the commonwealth over taxes and the presence of the British soldiers.

=== Boston Tea Party ===
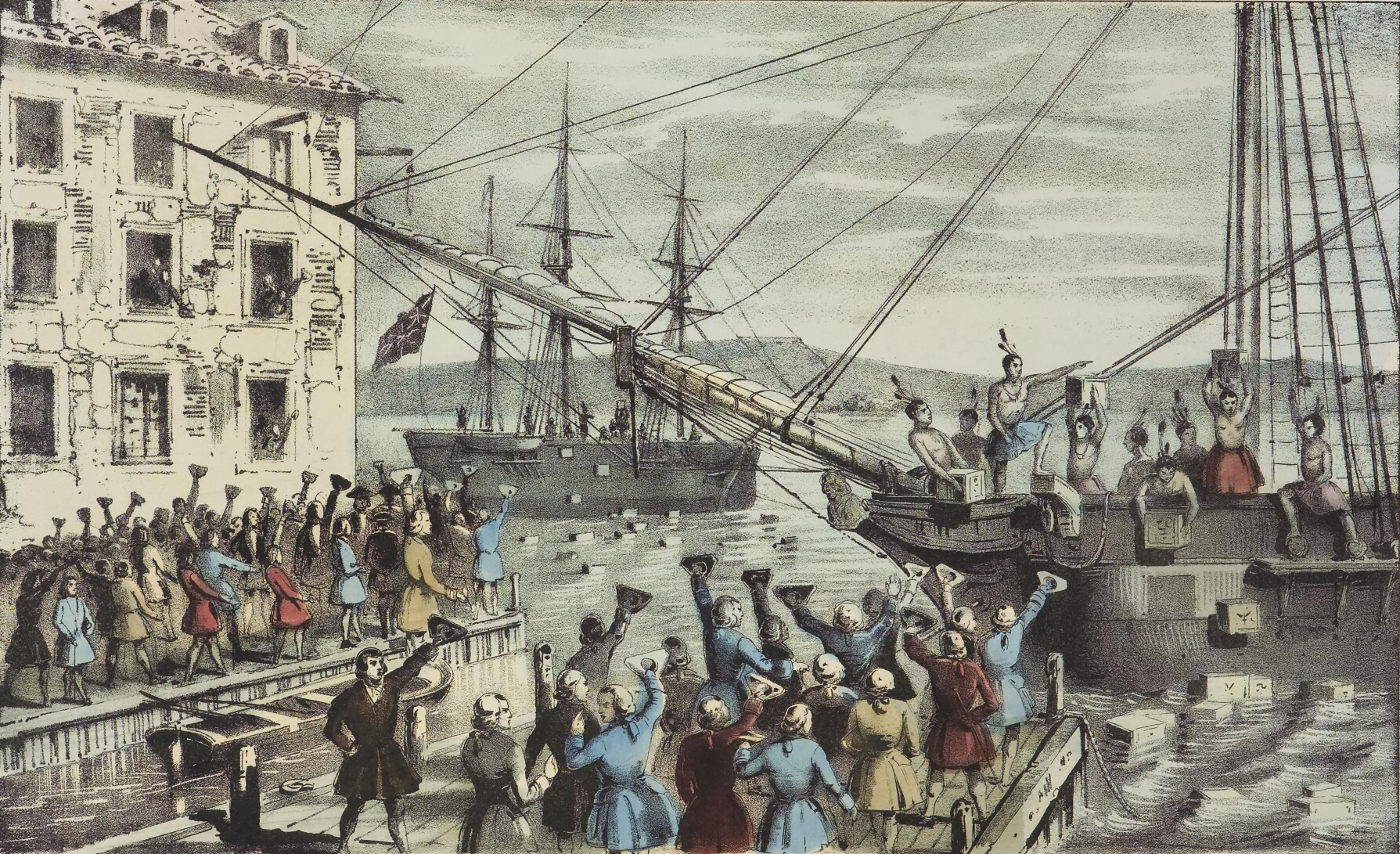
Boston Tea Party

One of the many taxes protested by the colonists was a tax on tea, imposed when Parliament passed the Townshend Acts, and retained when most of the provisions of those acts were repealed. With the passage of the Tea Act in 1773, tea sold by the British East India Company would become less expensive than smuggled tea, and there would be reduced profit-making opportunities for Massachusetts merchants traded in tea. This led to protests against the delivery of the company's tea to Boston. On December 16, 1773, when a tea ship of the East India Company was planning to land taxed tea in Boston, a group of local men known as the Sons of Liberty sneaked onto the boat the night before it was to be unloaded and dumped all the tea into the harbor, an act known as the Boston Tea Party.

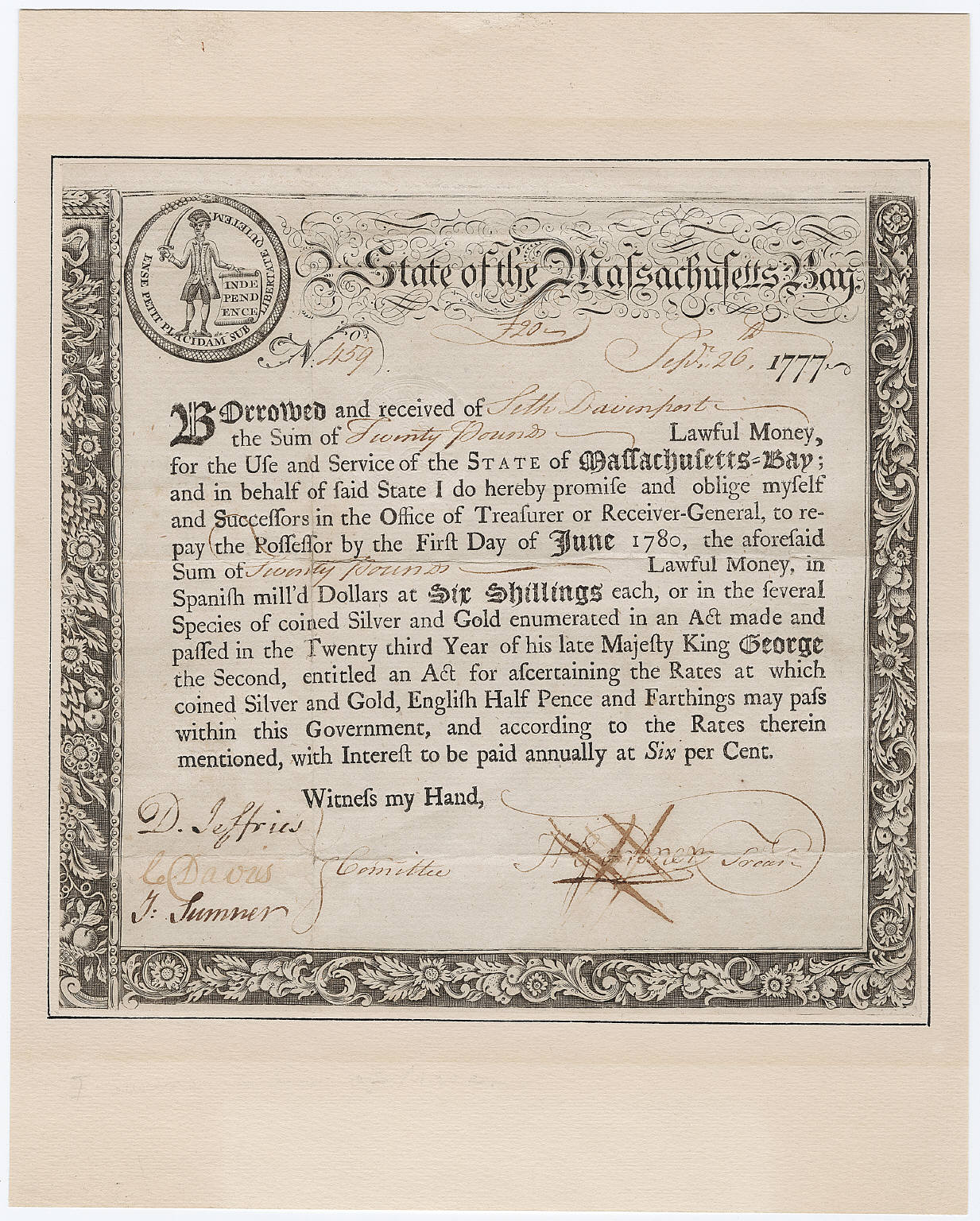
Certificate of government of Massachusetts Bay acknowledging loan of £20 to state treasury by Seth Davenport. September 1777

=== American Revolution ===
The Boston Tea Party prompted the British government to pass the Intolerable Acts in 1774 that brought stiff punishment on Massachusetts. They closed the port of Boston, the economic lifeblood of the Commonwealth, and reduced self-government. Local self-government was ended and the colony put under military rule. The Patriots formed the Massachusetts Provincial Congress after the provincial legislature was disbanded by Governor Gage. The suffering of Boston and the tyranny of its rule caused great sympathy and stirred resentment throughout the Thirteen Colonies. On February 9, 1775, the British Parliament declared Massachusetts to be in rebellion, and sent additional troops to restore order to the colony. With the local population largely opposing British authority, troops moved from Boston on April 18, 1775, to destroy the military supplies of local resisters in Concord. Paul Revere made his famous ride to warn the locals in response to this march. On the 19th, in the Battles of Lexington and Concord, where the famous "shot heard 'round the world" was fired, British troops, after running over the Lexington militia, were forced back into the city by local resistors. The city was quickly brought under siege. Fighting broke out again in June when the British took the Charlestown Peninsula in the Battle of Bunker Hill after the colonial militia fortified Breed's Hill. The British won the battle, but at a very large cost, and were unable to break the siege. The British made a desperate attempt by using biological weapons against the Americans by sending infected civilians with smallpox behind American lines but this was soon contained by Continental General George Washington who launched a vaccination program to ensure his troops and civilians were in good health after the damage biological warfare caused. Soon after the Battle of Bunker Hill, General George Washington took charge of the rebel army, and when he acquired heavy cannon in March 1776, the British were forced to leave, marking the first great colonial victory of the war. Ever since, "Evacuation Day" has been celebrated as a state holiday.

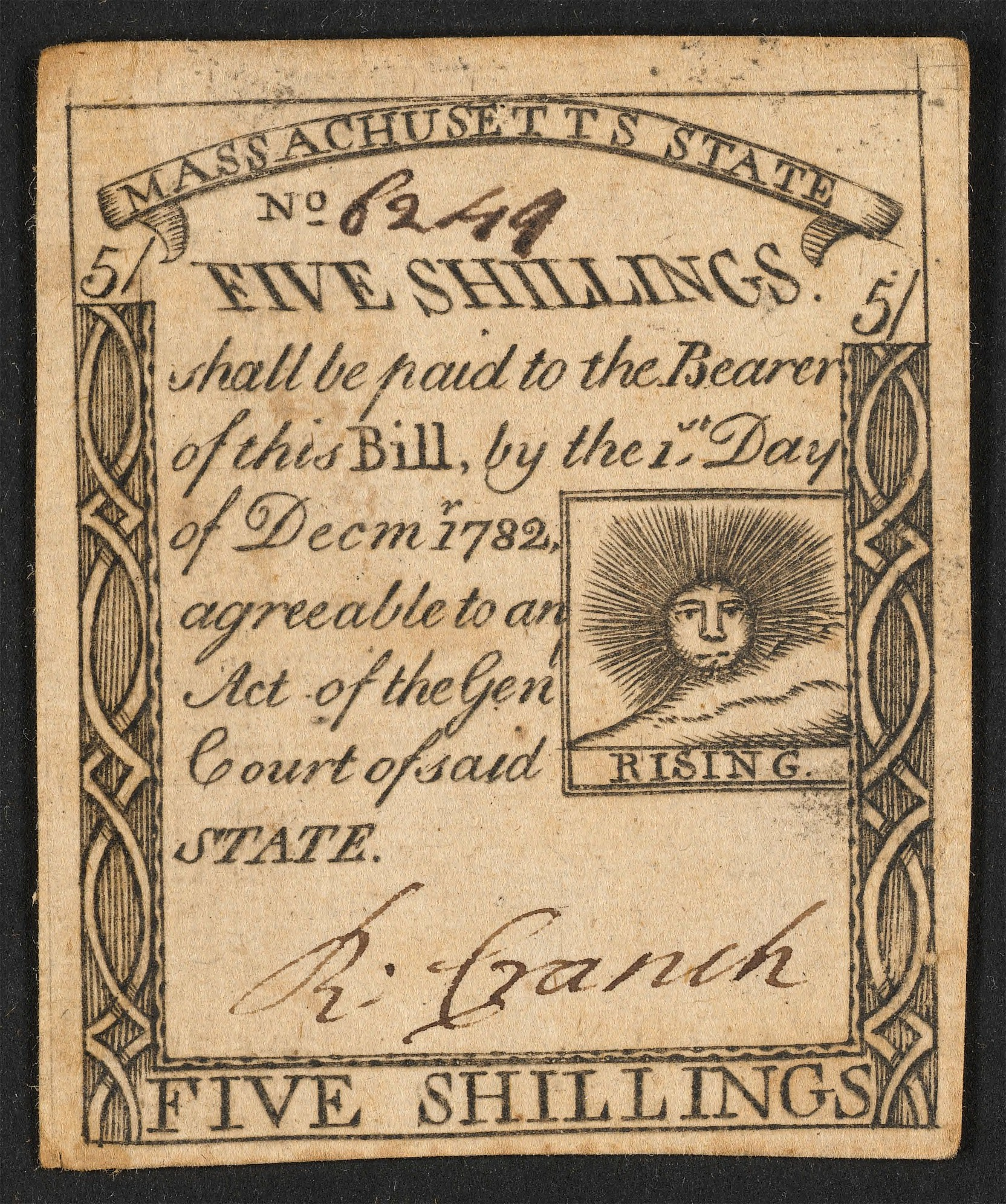
A Massachusetts five-shilling banknote issued in 1779.

The main contiguous territory of Massachusetts Bay was not invaded again, but in 1779 the disastrous Penobscot Expedition took place in the District of Maine, then part of the state. Trapped by the British fleet, the American sailors sank the ships of the Massachusetts state navy before it could be captured by the British. In May 1778, the section of Freetown that later became Fall River was raided by the British, and in September 1778, the communities of Martha's Vineyard and New Bedford were also subjected to a British raid.

John Adams was a leader in the independence movement and he helped secure a unanimous vote for independence from Britain. On July 4, 1776, the United States Declaration of Independence was adopted in Philadelphia. It was signed first by Massachusetts resident John Hancock, president of the Continental Congress. On July 18, this news reached Boston, and the Declaration was read from the balcony of the State House. Massachusetts immediately stopped using the words "colony" or "province" to describe itself; the name "State of Massachusetts Bay" was officially chosen by the Massachusetts Bay House of Representatives on December 7, 1776. The alliance of the United Colonies became the United States of America. Massachusetts was represented by its delegates in the Second Continental Congress, which continued as the provisional government of the thirteen states. Massachusetts ratified the Articles of Confederation in 1778, and these came into effect in 1781, binding the states into a "perpetual union".

Pressure to write a new state constitution began upon independence, especially from Western Massachusetts. The Massachusetts Provincial Congress and Governor's Council met as a single body for the Massachusetts Constitutional Convention of 1778. The proposal was rejected by voters. Delegates were elected to the Massachusetts Constitutional Convention of 1779–1780, which sent a draft, principally authored by John Adams, for debate and amendment by town meetings statewide. The revised text was adopted by the convention on June 15, 1780.

== Federalist Era: 1780–1815 ==
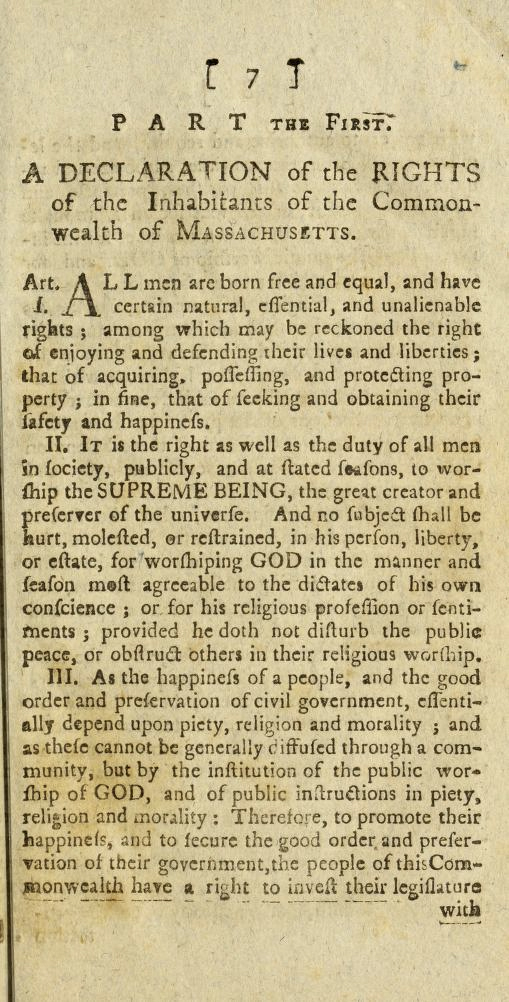
First articles, the Declaration of the Rights of the Inhabitants of the Commonwealth, in the 1780 Massachusetts Constitution

=== The new constitution ===
John Adams, along with Samuel Adams and James Bowdoin, wrote in the Preamble to the Constitution of the Commonwealth:

We, therefore, the people of Massachusetts, acknowledging, with grateful hearts, the goodness of the Great Legislator of the Universe, in affording us, in the course of His Providence, an opportunity, deliberately and peaceably, without fraud, violence or surprise, on entering into an Original, explicit, and Solemn Compact with each other; and of forming a new Constitution of Civil Government, for Ourselves and Posterity, and devoutly imploring His direction in so interesting a design, Do agree upon, ordain and establish, the following Declaration of Rights, and Frame of Government, as the Constitution of the Commonwealth of Massachusetts.

Bostonian John Adams, known as the "Atlas of Independence", was an important figure in both the struggle for independence as well as the formation of the new United States. Adams was highly involved in the push for separation from Britain and the writing of the Massachusetts Constitution in 1780 (which, in the Elizabeth Freeman and Quock Walker cases, effectively made Massachusetts the first state to have a constitution that declared universal rights and, as interpreted by Supreme Judicial Court Chief Justice William Cushing, abolished slavery). Adams became minister to Britain in the 1780s, Vice President in 1789 and succeeded Washington as President in 1797. His son, John Quincy Adams, would go on to become the sixth US president.

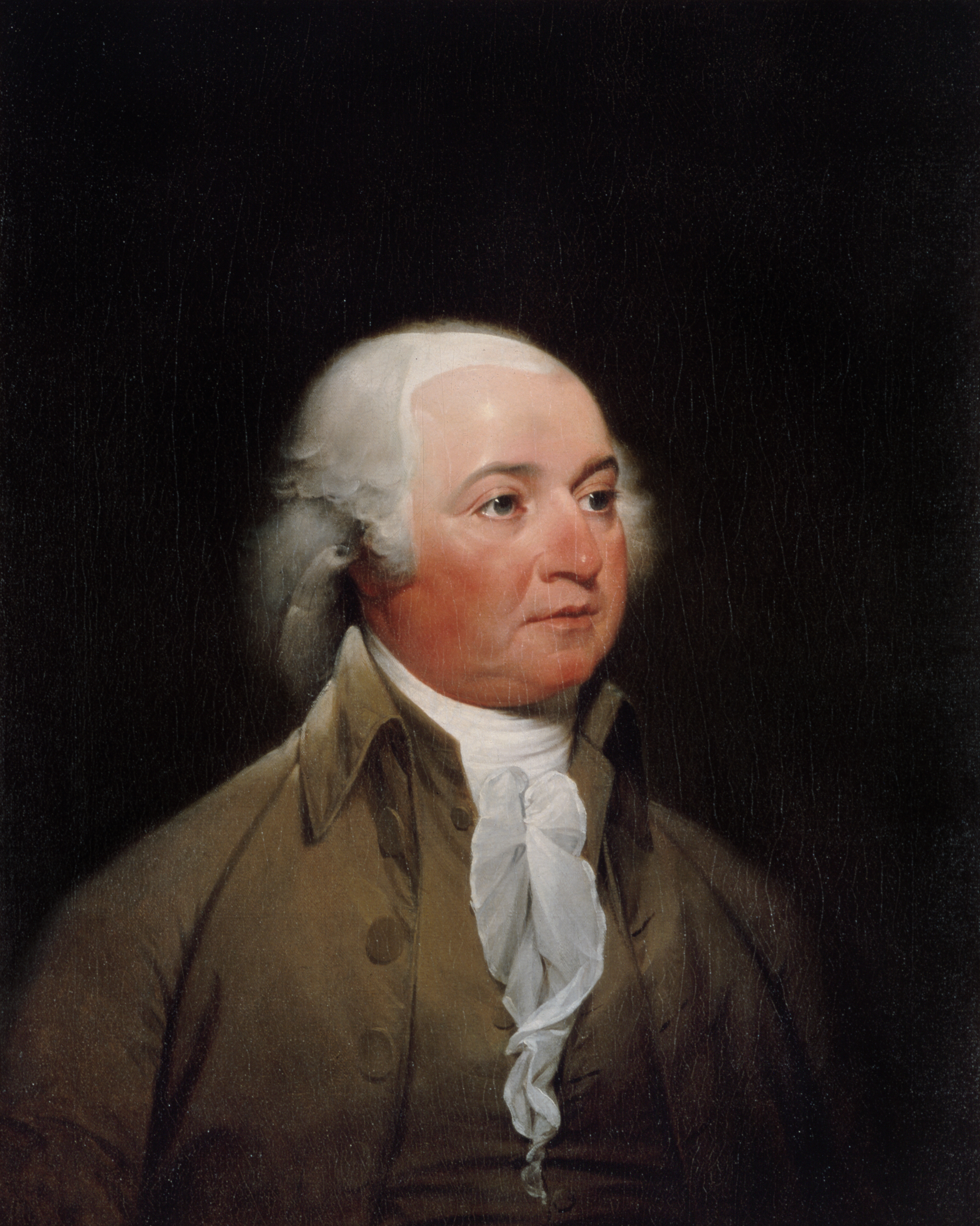
John Adams

Massachusetts was the first state in the United States to abolish slavery. (Vermont, which became part of the U.S. in 1791, abolished adult slavery somewhat earlier than Massachusetts, in 1777.) The new constitution also dropped any religious tests for political office, though local tax money had to be paid to support local churches. People who belonged to non-Congregational churches paid their tax money to their own church, and the churchless paid to the Congregationalists. Baptist leader Isaac Backus vigorously fought these provisions, arguing people should have freedom of choice regarding financial support of religion. Adams drafted most of the document and despite numerous amendments it still follows his line of thought. He distrusted utopians and pure democracy, and put his faith in a system of checks and balances; he admired the principles of the unwritten British Constitution. He insisted on a bicameral legislature which would represent both the gentlemen and the common citizen. Above all he insisted on a government by laws, not men. The constitution also changed the name of the State of Massachusetts Bay to the Commonwealth of Massachusetts. Still in force, it is the oldest constitution in current use in the world.

The 1780 constitution was highly influential upon the Constitution of the United States, which was drafted to create a strong federal government to replace the loose confederation of states. Massachusetts was the sixth state to ratify the new national constitution, on February 6, 1788; the new national government began operating in 1789.

=== Shays's Rebellion ===
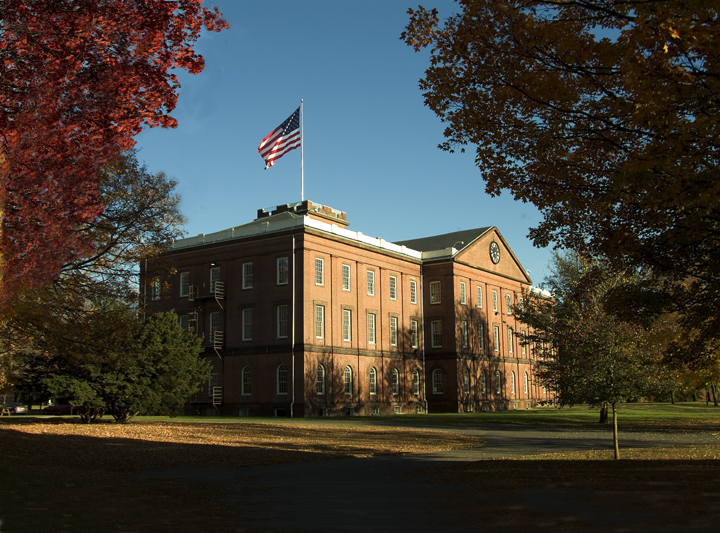
The Springfield Armory (building pictured is from the 19th century) was the first major target of the rebellion.

The economy of rural Massachusetts suffered an economic depression after the war ended. Merchants, pressured for hard currency by overseas partners, made similar demands on local debtors, and the state raised taxes in order to pay off its own war debts. Efforts to collect both public and private debts from cash-poor farmers led to protests that flared into direct action in August 1786. Rebels calling themselves Regulators (after the North Carolina Regulator movement of the 1760s) succeeded in shutting down courts meeting to hear debt and tax collection cases. By the end of 1786 a farmer in western Massachusetts named Daniel Shays emerged as one of the ringleaders, and government attempts to squelch the protests only served to radicalize the protestors. In January 1787 Shays and Luke Day organized an attempt to take the federal Springfield Armory; state militia holding the armory beat back the attempt with cannon fire. A private militia raised by wealthy Boston merchants and led by General Benjamin Lincoln broke the back of the rebellion in early February at Petersham, but small-scale resistance continued in the western parts of the state for a while.

The state put down the rebellion—but if it had been too weak to do so it would be no help to call on the ineffective federal government. The event led nationalists like George Washington to redouble efforts to strengthen the weak national government as necessary for survival in a dangerous world. Massachusetts, divided along class lines polarized by the rebellion, only narrowly ratified the United States Constitution in 1788.

=== Johnny Appleseed ===
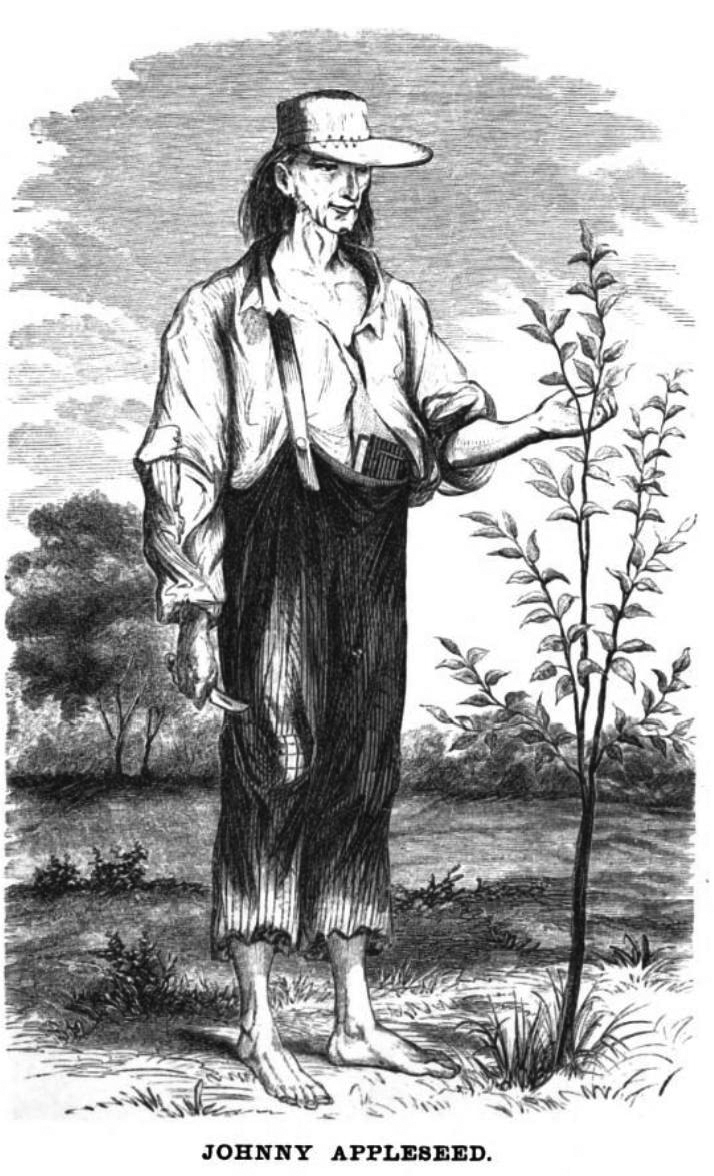
Johnny Appleseed

John Chapman often called Johnny "Appleseed" (born September 26, 1774, in Leominster, Massachusetts) was an American folk hero and pioneer nurseryman who introduced apple trees and established orchards to many areas in the Midwestern region of the country including Pennsylvania, Ohio, and Indiana. Today, Appleseed is the official folk hero of Massachusetts and his stature has served a focus in many children's books, movies, and folk tales since the end of the Civil War.

== Early industrial period: 1815–1860 ==
In 1836, Mary Lyon opened Mount Holyoke College, the first women's college in America. Lyon, a very active Congregationalist, promoted the college as an exemplification of the ideas of revivalist Jonathan Edwards regarding self-restraint, self-denial, and disinterested benevolence. One of the first students was reclusive poet Emily Dickinson.

During the 19th century, Massachusetts became a national leader in the American Industrial Revolution, with factories around Boston producing textiles and shoes, and factories around Springfield producing precision manufacturing tools and paper. The economy transformed from one based primarily on agriculture to an industrial one, initially making use of waterpower and later the steam engine to power factories, and canals and later railroads for transporting goods and materials. At first, the new industries drew labor from Yankees on nearby subsistence farms, and later relied upon Catholic immigrants from Ireland and Canada.

=== Industrial development ===
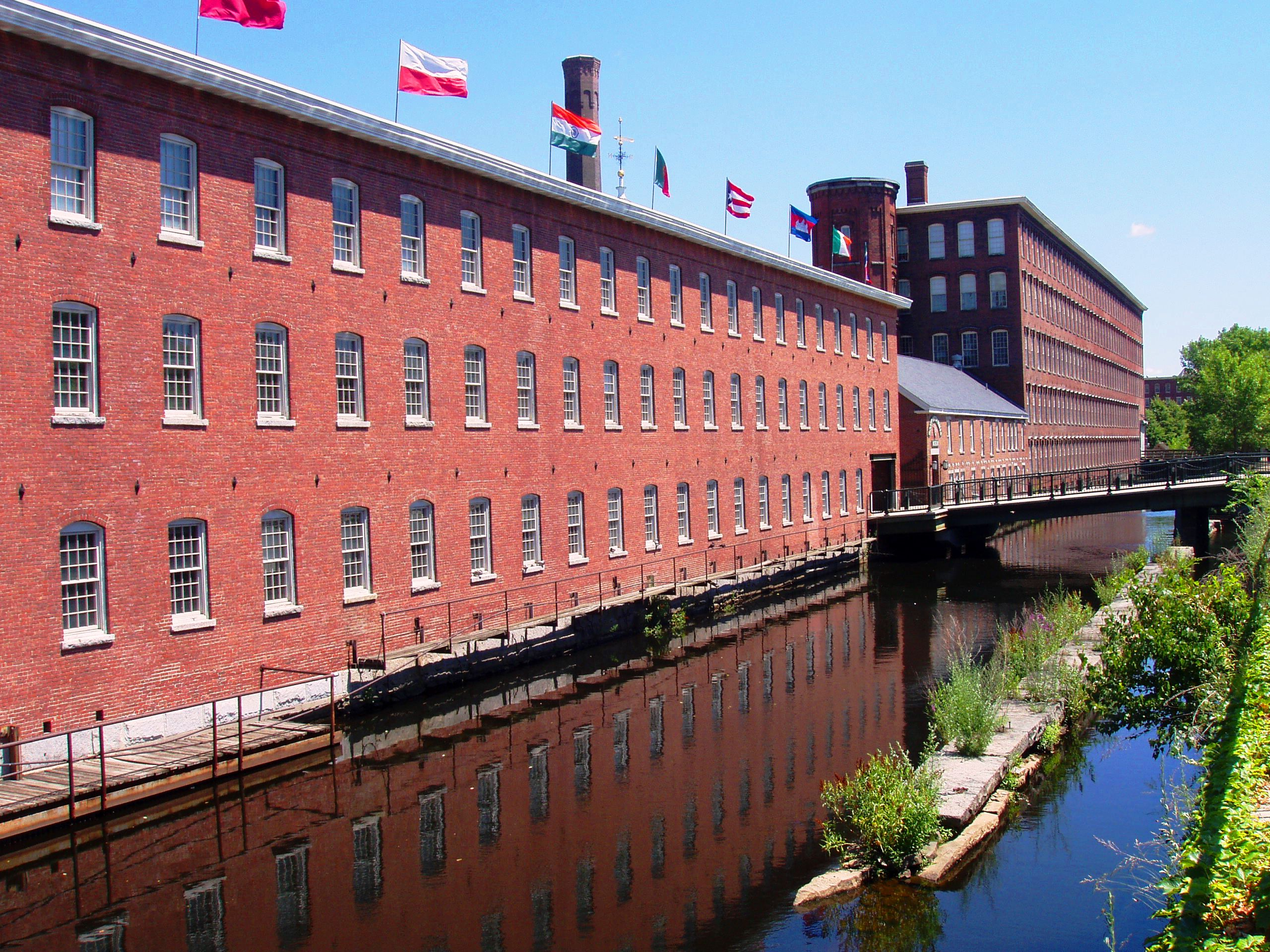
Textile mills such as the Boott Mills in Lowell made Massachusetts a leader in the US Industrial Revolution.

Massachusetts became a leader in industrial innovation and development during the 19th century. Since colonial times, there had been a successful iron making industry in New England. The first successful ironworks in America was established at Saugus in 1646, utilizing bog iron from swamps to produce plows, nails, firearms, hoops for barrels and other items necessary for the development of the Colony. Other industries would be established during this period, such as shipbuilding, lumber, paper and furniture making. These small-scale shops and factories often utilized the State's many rivers and streams to power their machinery.

While Samuel Slater had established the first successful textile mill at Pawtucket, Rhode Island, in 1793, there remained no way to efficiently mass-produce cloth from the spun yarn produced by the early mills. The yarn was still outsourced to small weaving shops where it was woven into cloth on hand looms. The first woolen mill, and the second textile mill in the Blackstone Valley, was a "wool carding mill", established in 1810 by Daniel Day, near the West River and Blackstone River at Uxbridge, Massachusetts. Then, in 1813, a group of wealthy Boston merchants led by Francis Cabot Lowell, known as the Boston Associates, established the first successful integrated textile mill in North America at Waltham. Lowell had visited England in 1810 and studied the Lancashire textile industry. Because the British government prohibited the export of this new technology, Lowell memorized plans for the power looms on his return trip to Boston. With the skill of master mechanic Paul Moody, the first successful power looms were produced, harnessing the power of the Charles River. For the first time, all phases of textile production could now be performed under one roof, greatly increasing production, and profits. This was the real beginning of the Industrial Revolution in America.

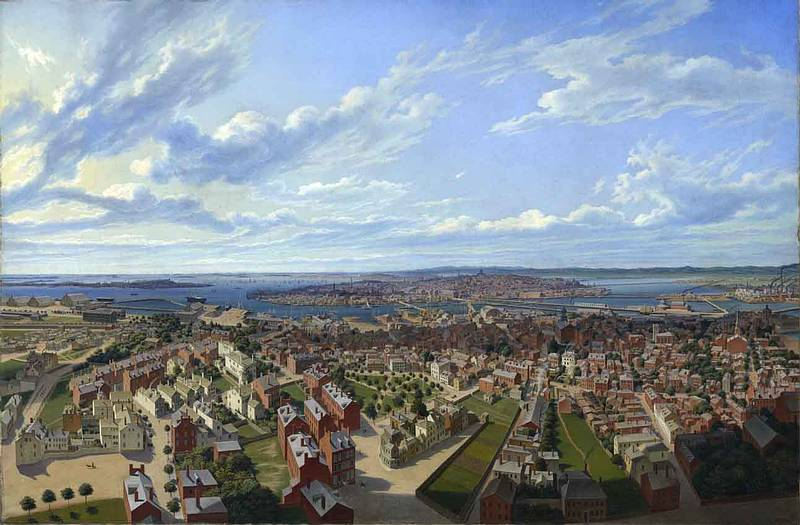
Boston painted by Hubert Sattler, c. 1850

With the early success of the Boston Manufacturing Company at Waltham, the Boston Associates would also later establish several other textile towns, including Lowell in 1823, Lawrence in 1845, Chicopee in 1848 and Holyoke in 1850.

Lowell grew quickly to a city of 33,000 people by 1850. Its mills were highly integrated and centrally controlled. An ingenious canal system provided the water power that drove the machinery. Steam power would be introduced beginning in the 1850s. The mill owners initially employed local farm women, often recruited from poor, remote parts of New England, and attempted to create a Utopian industrial society by providing housing, churches, schools and parks for their workers, unlike their English counterparts. Eventually, as the mills grew larger and larger, the owners turned to newly arrived Irish immigrants to fill their factories.

Industrial cities, especially Worcester and Springfield, became important centers in textile machinery (in Worcester's case) and precision tool production and innovation (in Springfield's case.) While Boston did not have many large factories, it became increasingly important as the business and transportation hub of all of New England, as well as a national leader in finance, law, medicine, education, arts and publishing.

==== Railroads ====
In 1826, the Granite Railway became the first commercial railroad in the nation. In 1830, the legislature chartered three new railroads—the Boston and Lowell, the Boston and Providence, and most important of all, the Boston and Worcester. In 1833, it chartered the Western Railroad to connect Worcester with Albany and the Erie Canal. The system flourished and western grain began flowing to the port of Boston for export to Europe, thereby breaking New York City's virtual monopoly on trade from the Erie Canal system. Much of the construction work was done by Irish work gangs. They lived in temporary camps but many settled in the new industrial cities along the line, where the gang bosses became leaders in the Democratic Party. Some of their work is still used. For example, the stone Canton Viaduct at Canton, Massachusetts, built in 1835, is still used by Amtrak's high-speed Acela Express along the Boston–Washington, Northeast Corridor. The viaduct required only minor changes to bring it up to late-20th-century standards.

==== Whaling ====
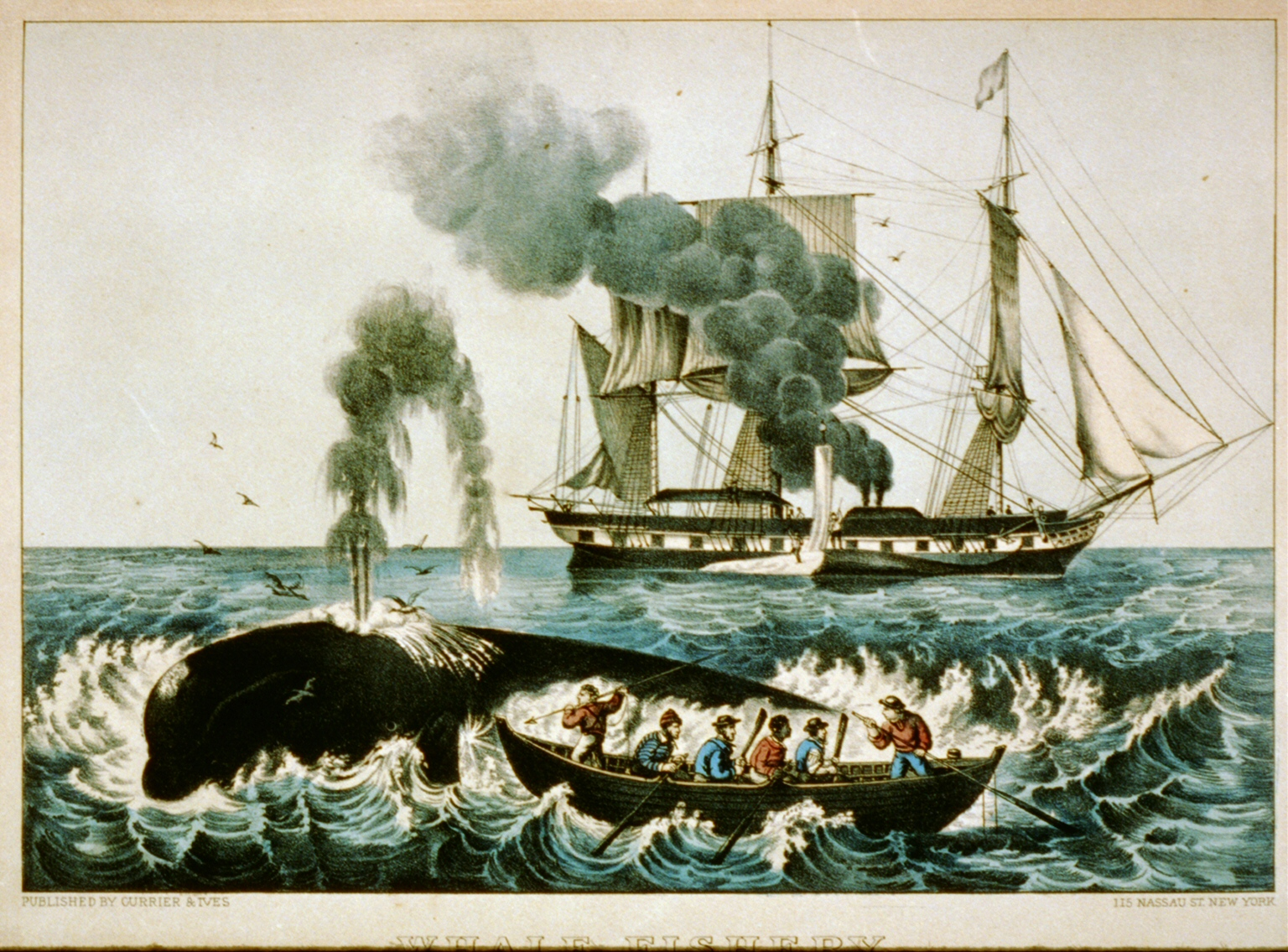
Whaling

Beginning in the late colonial period, Massachusetts leveraged its strong seafaring tradition, advanced shipbuilding industry, and access to the oceans to make the U.S. the pre-eminent whaling nation in the world by the 1830s. Whale oil was in demand chiefly for lamps. By the 1750s whaling in Nantucket had become a highly lucrative deep-sea industry, with voyages extending for years at a time and with vessels traveling as far as South Pacific waters. The British Navy captured most of the whalers during the revolution, but at the same time many whalers refitted as privateers against the British. Whaling recovered after the war as New Bedford became the center. Whalers took greater economic risks to turn major profits: expanding their hunting grounds and securing foreign and domestic workforces for the Pacific. Investment decisions and financing arrangements were set up so that managers of whaling ventures shared their risks by selling some equity claims but retained a substantial portion due to moral hazard considerations. As a result, they had little incentive to consider the correlation between their own returns and those of others in planning their voyages. This stifled diversity in whaling voyages and increased industry-wide risk. After 1860, kerosene replaced whale oil—concurrent with the devastation of the whaling fleet by Confederate commerce raiders—and the entrepreneurs shifted to manufacturing.

=== Political and social movements ===
On March 15, 1820, Maine was separated from Massachusetts and entered the Union as the 23rd State as a result of the enactment of the Missouri Compromise.

Horace Mann made the state system of schools the national model. The Commonwealth made its mark in Washington with such political leaders as Daniel Webster and Charles Sumner. Building on the many activist Congregational churches, abolitionism flourished. William Lloyd Garrison was the outstanding spokesperson, though many "cotton Whig" mill owners complained that the agitation was bad for their strong business ties to southern cotton planters.

The Congregationalists remained dominant in rural areas, but, in the cities, a new religious sensibility had replaced their straight-laced Calvinism. By 1826, reported Harriet Beecher Stowe:

All the literary men of Massachusetts were Unitarians. All the trustees and professors of Harvard College were Unitarians. All the élite of wealth and fashion crowded Unitarian churches. The judges on the bench were Unitarian, giving decisions by which the peculiar features of church organization, so carefully ordained by the Pilgrim fathers, had been nullified.

Some of the most important writers and thinkers of this time came from Massachusetts. Henry David Thoreau and Ralph Waldo Emerson are well known today for their contributions to American thought. Part of an intellectual movement known as Transcendentalism, they emphasized the importance of the natural world to humanity and were also part of the abolitionist call.

=== Know Nothing movement ===
The Know Nothing movement formed a new party in 1854 and captured almost all the seats in the legislature, the state government, and many cities. Historian John Mulkern finds the new party was populist and highly democratic, hostile to wealth, elites, and to expertise, and deeply suspicious of outsiders especially Catholics. The new party's voters were concentrated in the rapidly growing industrial towns, where Yankee workers faced direct competition with new Irish immigrants. Whereas the Whig Party was strongest in high income districts, the Know Nothing electorate was strongest in the poor districts. They voted out the traditional upper-class closed political leadership class, especially the lawyers and merchants. In their stead they elected working-class men, farmers, and a large number of teachers and ministers. Replacing the moneyed elite were men who seldom owned $10,000 in property.

In national perspective, the most aggressive and innovative legislation came out of Massachusetts, Both in terms of nativism and in terms of reforms. Historian Stephen Taylor says that in addition to nativist legislation:

the party also distinguished itself by its opposition to slavery, support for an expansion of the rights of women, regulation of industry, and support of measures designed to improve the status of working people.

It passed legislation to regulate railroads, insurance companies, and public utilities. It funded free textbooks for the public schools, and raised the appropriations for local libraries and for the school for the blind. Purification of Massachusetts against divisive social evils was a high priority. The legislature set up the state's first reform school for juvenile delinquents, while trying to block the importation of supposedly subversive government documents and academic books from Europe. It upgraded the legal status of wives, giving them more property rights and more rights in divorce courts. It passed harsh penalties on speakeasies, gambling houses and bordellos. Prohibition legislation imposed severe penalties: serving one glass of beer was punishable by six months in prison. Many juries refused to convict. Many of the reforms were quite expensive; State spending rose 45% on top of a 50% hike in annual taxes on cities and towns. The extravagance angered the taxpayers; few Know Nothings were reelected so the brief two-year experiment ended.

The highest priority included attacks on the civil rights of Irish Catholic immigrants. State courts lost the power to process applications for citizenship; the public schools had to require compulsory daily reading of the Protestant Bible (which the nativists were sure would transform the Catholic children). The governor disbanded the Irish militias, and replaced Catholics holding state jobs with Protestants. It failed to reach the two-thirds vote needed to pass a state constitutional amendment to restrict voting and office holding to men who had resided in Massachusetts for at least 21 years. The legislature then called on Congress to raise the requirement for naturalization from five years to 21 years, but Congress never acted.

The most dramatic move by the Know Nothing legislature was to appoint an investigating committee designed to prove widespread sexual immorality under way in Catholic convents. The press had a field day following the story, especially when it was discovered that the key reformer was using committee funds to pay for a prostitute. The legislature shut down its committee, ejected the reformer, and saw its investigation became a laughing stock.

== Civil War and Gilded Age: 1860–1900 ==
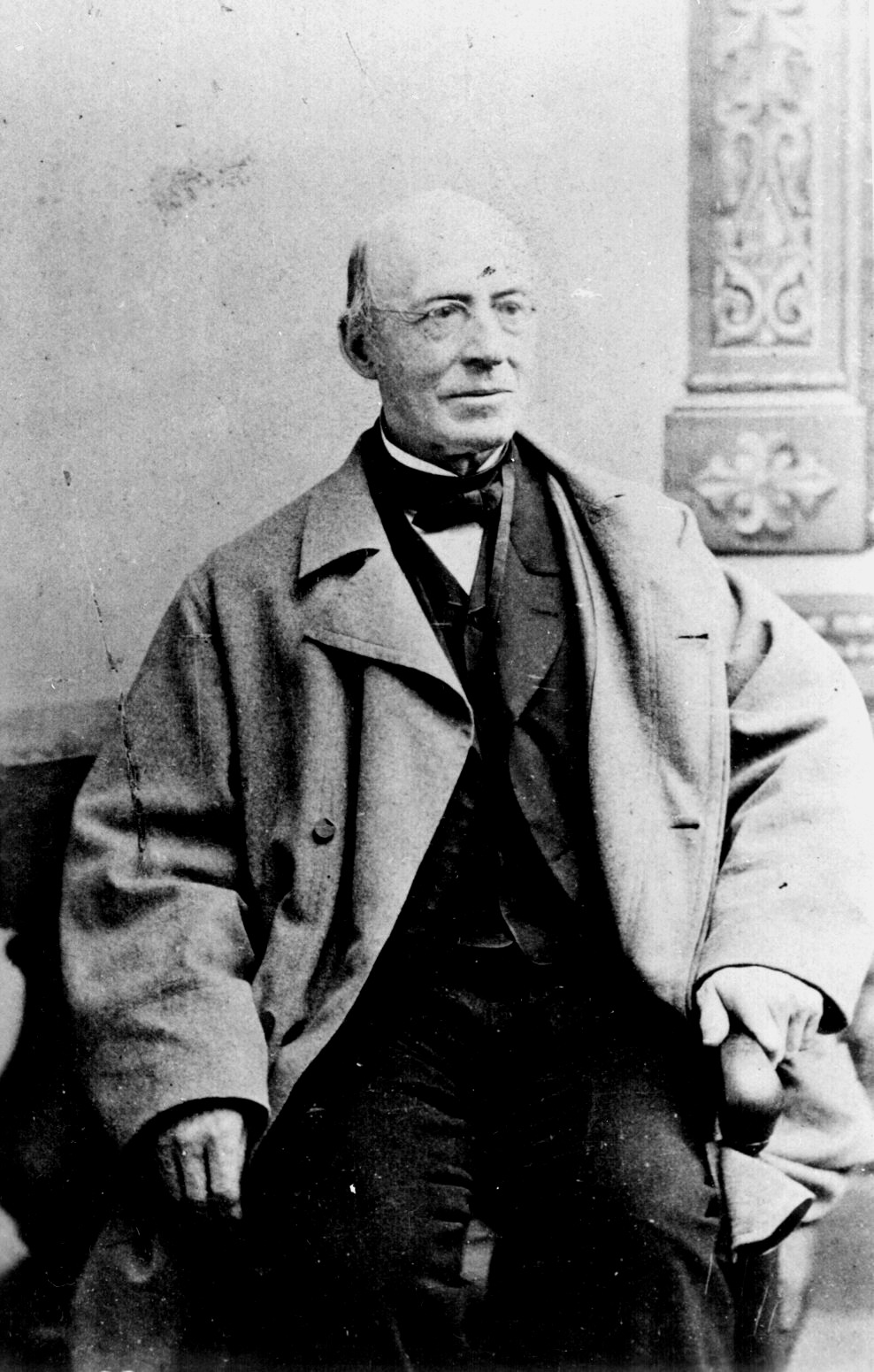
William Lloyd Garrison

In the years leading up to the Civil War, Massachusetts was a center of social progressivism, Transcendentalism, and abolitionist activity. Horace Mann made the state system of schools the national model. Two prominent abolitionists from the Commonwealth were William Lloyd Garrison and Wendell Phillips. Garrison founded the New England Anti-Slavery Society in 1832, and helped change perceptions on slavery. The movement increased antagonism over the issues of slavery, resulting in anti-abolitionist riots in Massachusetts between 1835 and 1837. The works of abolitionists contributed to the eventual actions of the Commonwealth during the Civil War.

Henry David Thoreau and Ralph Waldo Emerson made major contributions to American thought. Members of the Transcendentalism movement, they emphasized the importance of the natural world and emotion to humanity. Although significant opposition to abolitionism existed early on in Massachusetts, resulting in anti-abolitionist riots between 1835 and 1837, opposition to slavery gradually increased in the next few decades. Famed abolitionist John Brown moved to the ideologically progressive town of Springfield in 1846. It was there that Brown first became a militant anti-slavery proponent. In Springfield and in Boston, Brown met the connections that would both influence him, (Frederick Douglass and Sojourner Truth in Springfield,) and later fund his efforts, (Simon Sanborn and Amos Adams Lawrence in Boston,) in Bleeding Kansas and John Brown's raid on Harpers Ferry. In 1850, Brown founded his first militant, anti-slavery organization – The League of the Gileadites – in Springfield, to protect escaped slaves from 1850s Fugitive Slave Act. Massachusetts was a hotbed of abolitionism – particularly the progressive cities of Boston and Springfield – and contributed to subsequent actions of the state during the Civil War. Massachusetts was among the first states to respond to President Lincoln's call for troops. Massachusetts was the first state to recruit, train, and arm a Black regiment with White officers, the 54th Massachusetts Volunteer Infantry. The Robert Gould Shaw Memorial in Boston Common contains a relief depicting the 54th regiment. Much of the Union's weaponry for the Civil War was produced in Springfield, at the Springfield Armory.

Following the Civil War, thousands of immigrants from Canada and Europe continued to settle in the major cities of Massachusetts, attracted by employment in the state's ever-expanding factories. The state also became a leader in education and innovation through this period, particularly in the Boston area.

=== Invention of basketball and volleyball ===
In 1891, and 1895, the sports of basketball and volleyball—both now Olympic sports, popular worldwide—were invented in the Western Massachusetts cities of Springfield and Holyoke, respectively. Both inventors, James Naismith, and William G. Morgan sought to create games for groups at the YMCA, with Naismith seeking a fast-paced game for youths often confined indoors during New England's harsh winters. Morgan's invention of mintonette, soon renamed volleyball at the suggestion of colleague Professor Alfred T. Halsted, was a direct response to the then-new sport basketball, as he sought to create a fast-paced game with similar objectives that could be more easily played by a wider variety of players young and old, athletic and non-athletic. Today, Springfield is home to the international Basketball Hall of Fame. Holyoke is home to the international Volleyball Hall of Fame.

=== Industrial advance ===
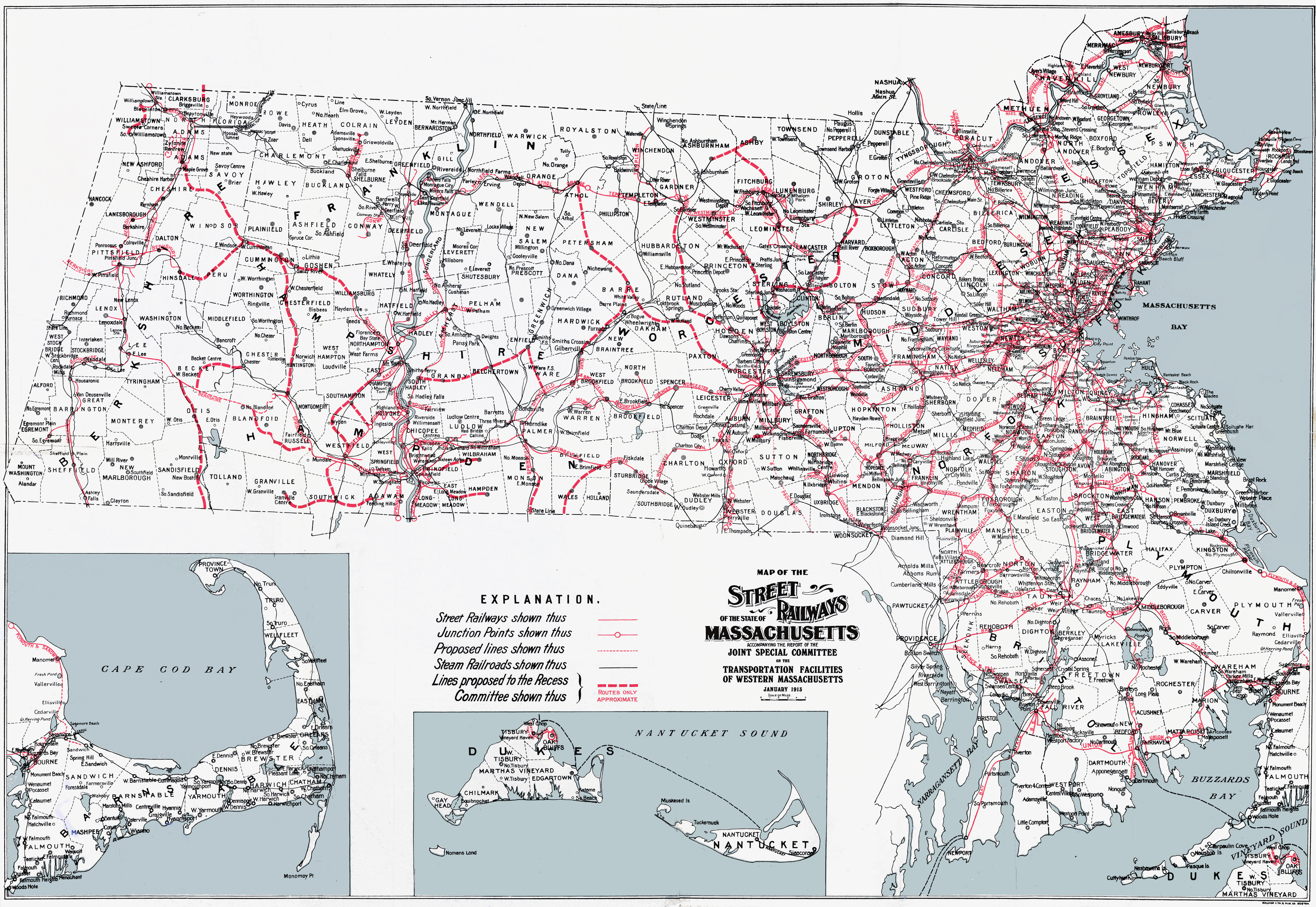
Interurban street railway systems, or "trolleys", in Massachusetts, 1913

In the 1890s—largely due to the presence of the Springfield Armory, which employed many skilled, mechanical workers—Greater Springfield became the United States' first major center of automobile and motorcycle innovation. The United States' first gasoline-powered automobile company, the Duryea Motor Wagon Company, was founded in Chicopee in 1893. The first American motorcycle company, the Indian Motorcycle Company, was founded in Springfield in 1901. Knox Automobile produced the world's first motorized fire engines in Springfield in 1906. File:Street railway workers with a thermite crucible on Main Street, Holyoke, 1904.png

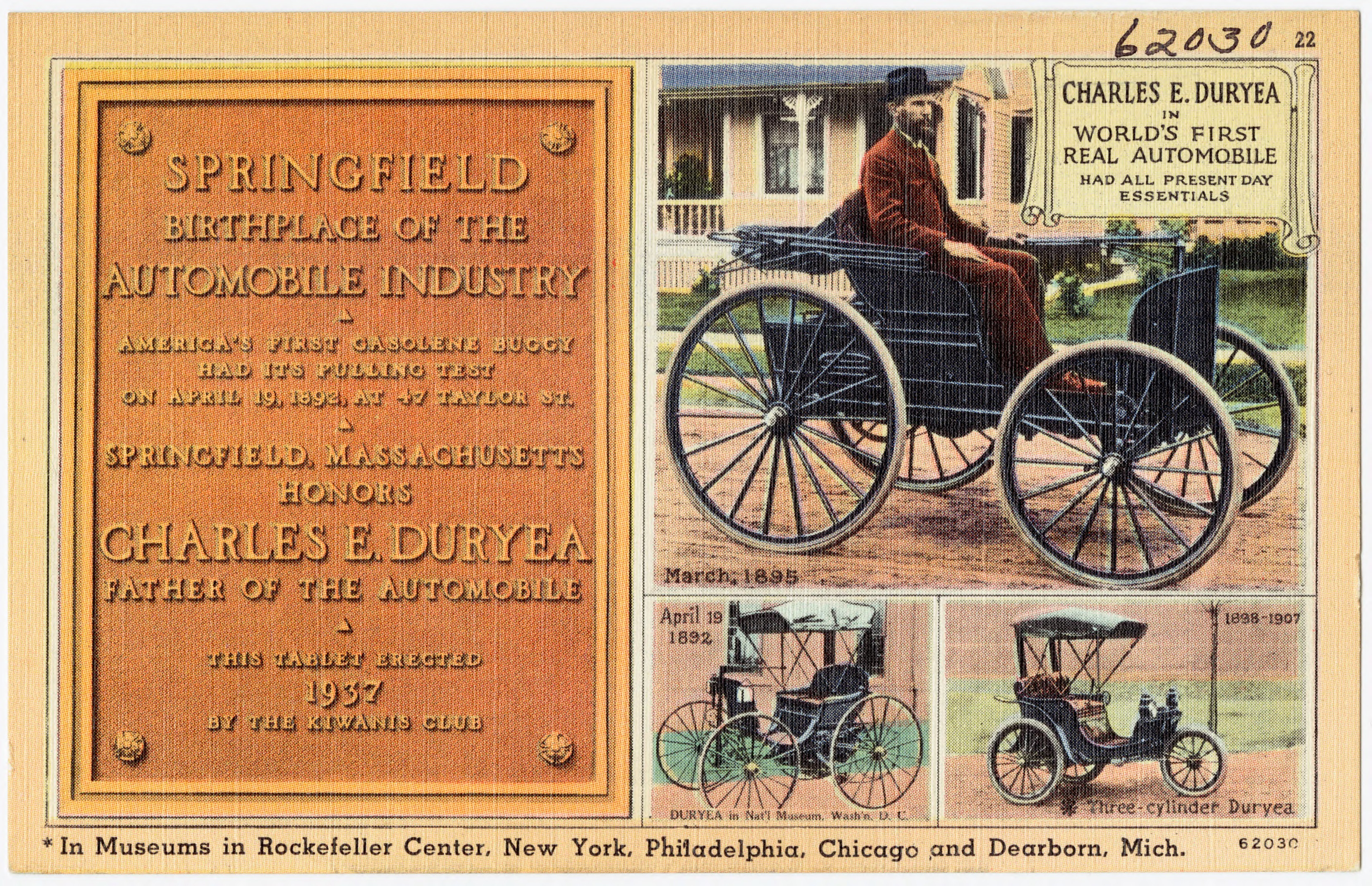
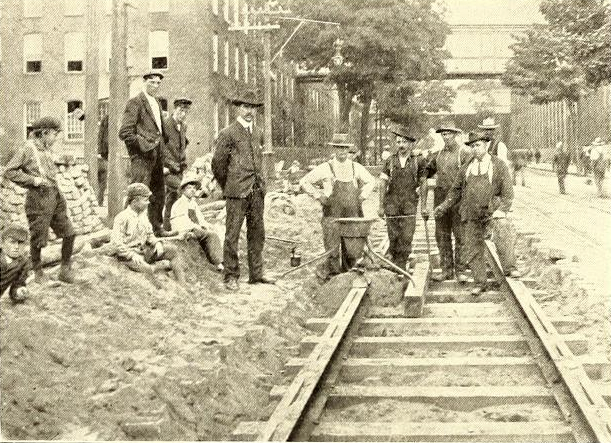
A plaque honoring Charles E. Duryea and the Duryea Motor Wagon Company of Springfield, first producer of an American gasoline automobile; Charles Pellissier and Holyoke Street Railway workers with a crucible prior to ignition, as the first mile of track in the United States is laid with thermite welding in 1904

Although the basic rail system was in place by 1860, the railways continued to make major improvements in tracks, signals, bridging, and facilities. With steel came heavier trains and more powerful locomotives. In the 1880s the Boston & Albany Railroad invested heavily in its physical facilities, including the construction of over 30 new passenger stations. Famed Boston architect H. H. Richardson did much of the design work.

Passenger transportation was revolutionized by the electric trolley. Thomas Davenport, the first American to construct a DC electric motor, first demonstrated the feasibility of the electric railway in Springfield with a small circular railway in late 1835, which was subsequently exhibited in Boston that winter. Decades later in 1890, Springfield's first electric line was constructed by the Springfield Street Railway Company, and by 1905 the city had more track than New York City. These lines provided rapid, cheap transportation for farm produce and workers, created land booms in suburbia, and permitted Sunday outings in the country. They were highly profitable and the base of numerous fortunes.

Massachusetts played a unique role in what other states called the Progressive Era, 1900–1917. It was relatively conservative in the early 20th century with a weak progressive movement. However, in the late 19th century the old upper-class Yankee establishment had put in place many of the reforms that other states adopted as progressive reforms. The state showed little support for prohibition or woman suffrage.

== Prosperity decades: 1900–29 ==
Massachusetts entered the 20th century with a strong industrial economy. Despite a lack of agricultural progress, the economy prospered between 1900 and 1919. Factories throughout the Commonwealth produced goods varying from paper to metals. Boston, in the year 1900, was still the second most important port in the United States, as well as the most valuable U.S. port in terms of its fish market. By 1908, however, the value of the port dropped considerably due to competition. Population growth during this period, which was aided by immigration from abroad, helped in urbanization and forced a change in the ethnic make-up of the Commonwealth.

The largely industrial economy of Massachusetts began to falter, however, due to the dependence of factory communities upon the production of one or two goods. External low-wage competition, coupled with other factors of the Great Depression in later years, led to the collapse of the state's two main industries: shoes and textiles. Between 1921 and 1949 the failure of those industries resulted in rampant unemployment and the urban decay of once-prosperous industrial centers which would persist for several decades.

The industrial economy began a decline in the early 20th century with the exodus of many manufacturing companies. By the 1920s competition from the South and Midwest, followed by the Great Depression, led to the collapse of the three main industries in Massachusetts: textiles, shoemaking, and mechanized transportation. This decline would continue into the latter half of the century; between 1950 and 1979, the number of Bay Staters involved in textile manufacturing declined from 264,000 to 63,000. The Springfield Armory, the United States' Military's munitions producer since 1777, was controversially shut down by the Pentagon in 1968. This spurred an exodus of high-paying jobs from Western Massachusetts, which suffered greatly as it de-industrialized during the last 40 years of the 20th century. In Eastern Massachusetts, following World War II, the economy was transformed from one based on heavy industry into a service and high-tech based economy. Government contracts, private investment, and research facilities led to a new and improved industrial climate, with reduced unemployment and increased per capita income. Suburbanization flourished, and by the 1970s, the Route 128 corridor was dotted with high-technology companies who recruited graduates of the area's many elite institutions of higher education.

On Thursday, October 1, 1903, the city of Boston made history by hosting the inaugural World Series at the Huntington Avenue Grounds. The Boston Red Sox won the best-of-nine series and launched into a baseball dynasty in the following years by capturing five championships in fifteen years behind Hall of Famer Babe Ruth.

Massachusetts also endured class conflict during this period. In the 1912 general strike in Lawrence, almost all of the town's mills were forced to shut down as a result of strife over wages that sustained only poverty. The Commonwealth was confronted with issues of worker conditions and wages. For example, when the legislature decreed that women and children could work only 50 hours per week, employers cut wages proportionally. Eventually, the demands of the Lawrence strikers were heeded, and a pay increase was made.

Calvin Coolidge served as Massachusetts governor from 1919 to 1921, then Vice President of the United States until 1923, and US President until 1929.

== Depression and war: 1929–1945 ==
Even before the Great Depression struck the United States, Massachusetts was experiencing economic problems. The crash of the Commonwealth's major industries led to declining population in factory towns. The Boston metropolitan area became one of the slowest-growing areas in the United States between 1920 and 1950. Internal migration within the Commonwealth, however, was altered by the Great Depression. In the wake of economic woes, people moved to the metropolitan area of Boston looking for jobs, only to find high unemployment and dismal conditions. In the depressed situation that predominated in Boston during this era, racial tension sometimes manifested itself in gang warfare, notably with clashes between the Irish and Italians.

On the subject of securities laws in the early 1930s in response to the Great Depression, Boston figured prominently. Three Harvard professors, Felix Frankfurter, Benjamin V. Cohen and James M. Landis drafted both Securities Act of 1933 and Securities Exchange Act of 1934. The 1st Chair of the U.S. Securities and Exchange Commission, Joseph P. Kennedy Sr. was from Boston. Kennedy Sr. had this to say before the Boston Chamber of Commerce on November 15, 1934: "Necessary, legitimate, useful, profitable enterprise will be encouraged. Only the senseless, vicious, and fraudulent activities will be curtailed, and these must and will be eradicated. The initials S-E-C, we hope, will come to stand for Securities Ex-Crookedness. Confidence is an outgrowth of character. We believe that character exists strongly in the financial world, so we do not have to compel virtue; we seek to prevent vice." On June 6, 1934, FDR signed the Securities Exchange Act into law with Pecora. At one point Roosevelt asked Pecora, "Ferd, now that I have signed this bill and it has become law, what kind of law will it be?" "It will be a good or bad bill, Mr. President," replied Pecora, "depending upon the men who administer it." (Ritchie, 59)

The economic and social turmoil in Massachusetts marked the beginning of a change in the Commonwealth's way of functioning. Politics helped to encourage stability among social groups by elevating members of various ranks in society, as well as ethnic groups, to influential posts. The two major industries of Massachusetts, shoes and textiles, had declined in a way that even the post-World War II economic boom could not reverse. Thus, the Commonwealth's economy was ripe for change as the post-war years dawned.

== Economic changes: decline of manufacturing, 1945–1985 ==
Historical population changes among Massachusetts municipalities. Click to see animation.

World War II precipitated great changes in the economy of Massachusetts, which led to changes in society. The aftermath of WWII created a global economy that was focused upon the interests of the United States, both militarily and in relation to business. The domestic economy in the United States was altered by government procurement policies focused on defense. In the years following WWII, Massachusetts was transformed from a factory-based economy to one based on services and technology. During WWII, the U.S. government had built facilities that they leased, and in the post-war years sold, to defense contractors. Such facilities contributed to an economy focused on creating specialized defense goods. That form of economy prospered as a result of the Cold War, the Vietnam War, and the Korean War.

In the ensuing years, government contracts, private investment, and research facilities helped to create a modern industry, which reduced unemployment and increased per capita income. All of these economic changes encouraged suburbanization and the formation of a new generation of well-assimilated and educated middle-class workers. At the same time, suburbanization and urban decay highlighted differences between various social groups, leading to a renewal of racial tension. Boston, a paragon of the problems in Massachusetts cities, experienced numerous challenges that led to racial problems. The problems facing urban centers included declining population, middle-class flight, departure of industry, high unemployment, rising taxes, low property values, and competition among ethnic groups.

=== Housing policy and affordability ===
Housing policy became a recurring political issue in Massachusetts during the late twentieth and early twenty-first centuries. In 1970, the state authorized certain municipalities to adopt local rent-control programs. Rent control was adopted in several communities, but by the early 1990s remained in effect only in Boston, Cambridge, and Brookline. In 1994, voters approved a statewide ballot initiative prohibiting most local rent-control laws. Housing affordability remained a major issue in later decades, as high housing costs contributed to population outflow and renewed debate over rent regulation, zoning, and housing production.

== The Kennedy family ==
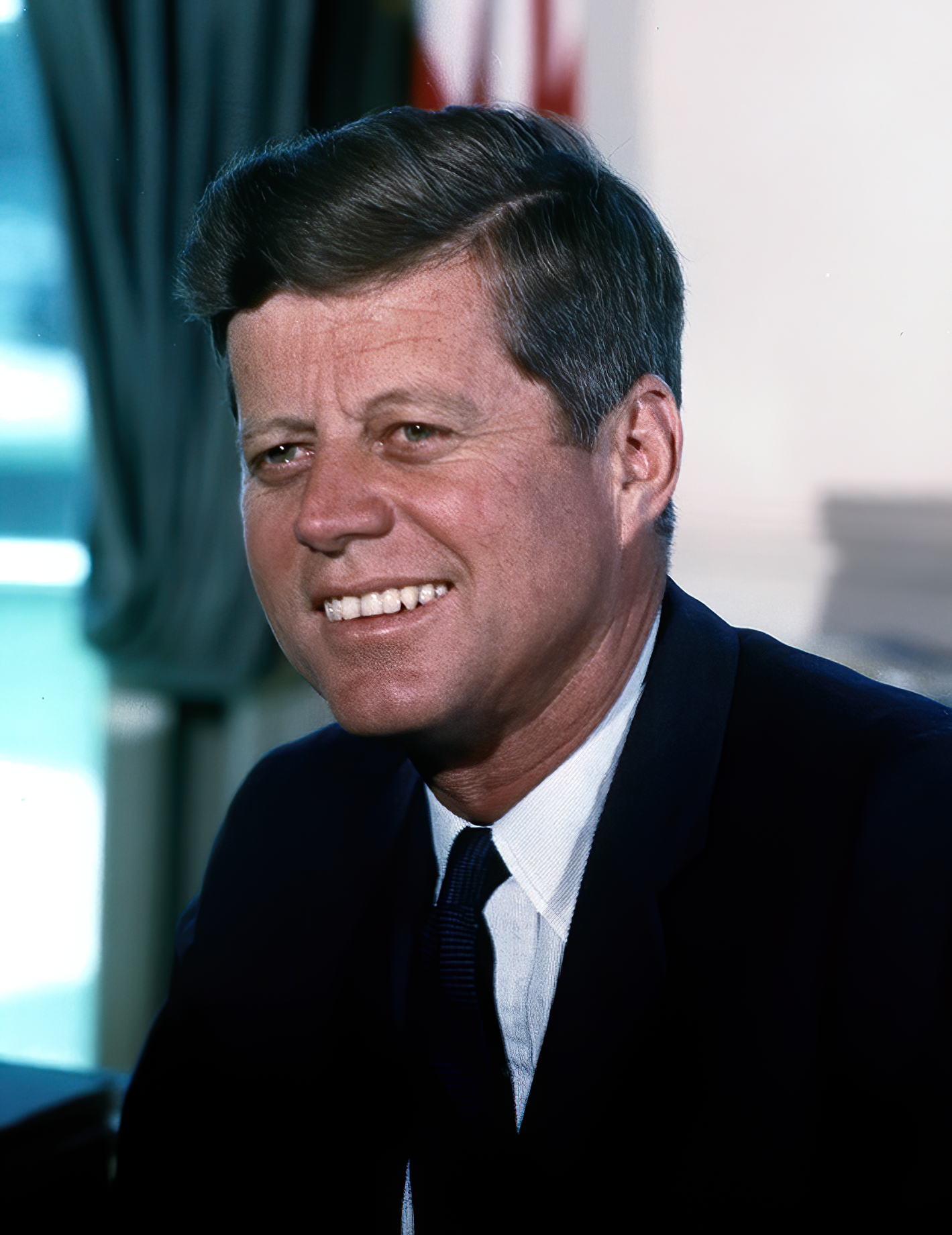
John F. Kennedy, Massachusetts native and 35th President of the United States (1961–1963)

The Kennedy family was prominent in Massachusetts politics in the 20th century. Children of businessman and ambassador Joseph P. Kennedy Sr. included:

- John F. Kennedy, a United States senator from Massachusetts from 1953 to 1960 and president of the United States from 1961 until his assassination in 1963
- Robert F. Kennedy, United States Attorney General from 1961 to 1964, United States senator from New York from 1965 to 1968, and presidential candidate in 1968 until his assassination
- Ted Kennedy, a United States senator from Massachusetts from 1962 until his death in 2009 and presidential candidate in 1980
- Eunice Kennedy Shriver, a co-founder of the Special Olympics.

John F. Kennedy's birthplace and early childhood home is located on Beals Street in Brookline, Massachusetts. The famous Kennedy Compound is located in Hyannis Port, Massachusetts on Cape Cod.

== Modern economy and society: 1985–present ==
Over the past 20–30 years, Massachusetts has cemented its place in the country as a center of education (especially higher education) and high-tech industry, including the biotechnology and information technology sectors. With better-than-average schools overall and many elite universities, the area was well placed to take advantage of the technology-based economy of the 1990s. The rebound from the decay of manufacturing into the high-technology sector is often referred to as the Massachusetts Miracle.

The Commonwealth had several notable citizens in federal government in the 1980s, including presidential hopeful Senator Ted Kennedy and House Speaker Tip O'Neill. This legislative influence allowed the Commonwealth to receive federal highway funding for the $14.6 billion Boston Central Artery/Tunnel Project. Known colloquially as "the Big Dig", it was, at the time, the most expensive federal highway project ever approved. Designed to relieve some of the traffic problems of the poorly planned city, it was approved in 1987, and effectively completed in 2005. The project was controversial due to massive budget overruns, repeated construction delays, water leaks in the new tunnels in 2004, and a ceiling collapse in 2006 that killed a Bostonian.

Several Massachusetts politicians have run for the office of President of the United States in this period, won the primary elections, and gone on to contest the national elections. These include:

- Michael Dukakis in 1988; defeated by George H. W. Bush
- John Kerry in 2004; defeated by George W. Bush
- Mitt Romney in 2012; defeated by Barack Obama

In 2002, the Roman Catholic Church sex abuse scandal involving local priests became public. The Archdiocese of Boston was found to have knowingly moved priests who sexually molested children from parish to parish and to have covered up abuse. The revelations caused the resignation of the archbishop, Cardinal Bernard Law, and resulted in an $85 million settlement with the victims. With the large Irish and Italian Catholic populations in Boston, this was a big concern. The diocese, under financial pressure, closed many of its churches. In some churches, parishioners camped out in the churches to protest and block closure.

On November 18, 2003, the Massachusetts Supreme Judicial Court (SJC) decided that the Commonwealth could not deny marriage rights to gay couples under the state constitution. On February 4, 2004, the SJC followed that ruling with a statement saying that allegedly separate but equal civil unions, implemented as of late in Vermont, would not pass constitutional muster and that only full gay marriage rights met constitutional guarantees. On May 17, 2004, the ruling took effect and thousands of gay and lesbian couples across the Commonwealth entered into marriage. Opponents of gay marriage subsequently pushed for an amendment to the state constitution that would allow the state to deny marriage rights to gay couples. It was necessary for the amendment to be approved by at least 1/4 of the members present in two consecutive legislative sessions of the Massachusetts legislature, and to receive majority support in a popular referendum. It passed the first legislative session, but was defeated in the second session, receiving less than 1/4 of the votes of the legislators present. As public opinion polls currently indicate majority support for gay marriage among the people of the Commonwealth, it is likely that the issue is settled in Massachusetts.

Increased white-collar jobs have driven suburban sprawl, but the consequent effects of sprawl have been lessened by regulations on land use and zoning, as well as an emphasis on "smart growth". In recent years, the Commonwealth has lost population as high housing costs have driven many away from Massachusetts. The Boston area is the third most expensive housing market in the country. Over the last several years there has been a net outflow of about 19,000 people from the Commonwealth.

In 2006, the Massachusetts legislature enacted the first plan in the United States to provide all Commonwealth citizens with universal health insurance coverage, using a variety of private insurance providers. Insurance coverage for low-income individuals is paid for with tax revenues, and higher income people who don't have health insurance are required to purchase it. (The health insurance market is publicly regulated, so, at least in Massachusetts, no one can be denied coverage because of pre-existing conditions or be forced to pay exorbitant rates.) The implementation of Commonwealth Care, the new universal coverage law, is proceeding, as of 2007.

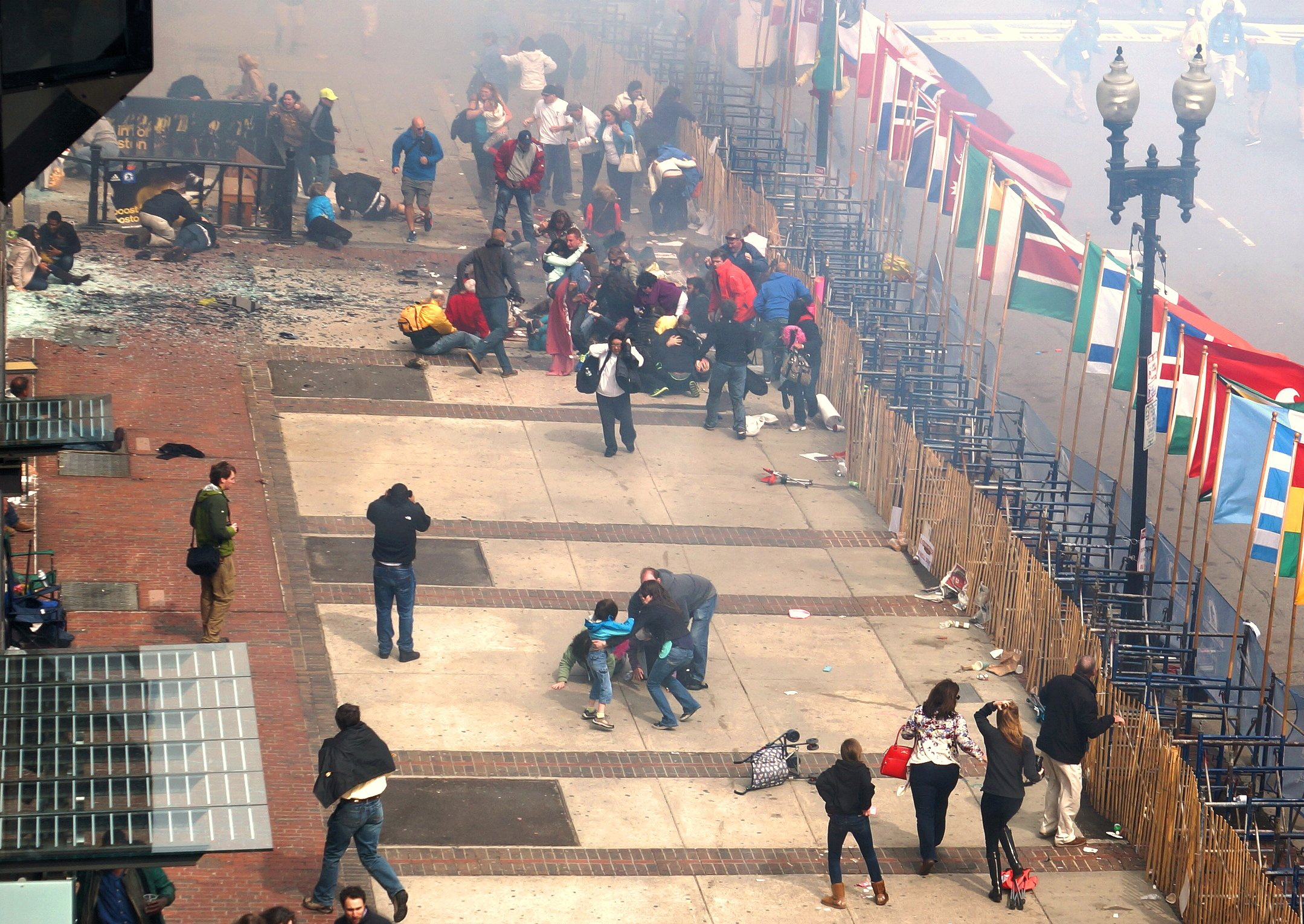
Boston Marathon bombing

Two bombs exploded near the finish line of the Boston Marathon on April 15, 2013, killing three spectators and injuring 264. The 2 brothers Tamerlan Tsarnaev and Dzhokhar Tsarnaev set the bombs because they were motivated by extremist Islamic beliefs and learned to build explosive devices from an online magazine of an al-Qaeda affiliate.

On November 8, 2016, Massachusetts voted for The Massachusetts Marijuana Legalization Initiative, also known as Question 4. It was included on the United States presidential election, 2016 ballot in Massachusetts as an indirect initiated state statute.

=== The Big Dig ===
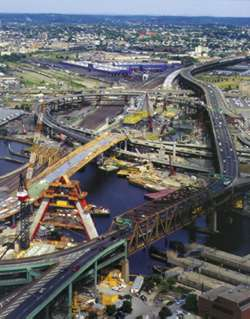
Part of the "Big Dig" construction project; this portion is over the Charles River

In 1987, the state received federal funding for the Central Artery/Tunnel Project. Known as "the Big Dig", it was at the time the biggest federal highway project ever approved. The project included making the Central Artery a tunnel under downtown Boston, in addition to the re-routing of several other major highways. Often controversial, with numerous claims of graft and mismanagement, and with its initial price tag of $2.5 billion increasing to a final tally of over $15 billion, the Big Dig has nonetheless changed the face of Downtown Boston. It has connected areas once divided by elevated highway (much of the raised old Central Artery was replaced with the Rose Kennedy Greenway), and improved traffic conditions along a number of routes.

== Boundaries ==
The history of the boundaries of Massachusetts is somewhat complex and covers several centuries. Land grants made to various groups of early colonists, mergers and secessions, and settlements of various boundary disputes all had a major influence on the modern definition of the Commonwealth. Disputes arose due to both overlapping grants, inaccurate surveys (creating a difference between where the border "should" be and where markers are placed on the ground). Having loyal settlers actually on the ground also partially determined which portions of their vast claims early groups held on too.

=== Founding grants ===
In 1607, the Plymouth Company was granted a coastal charter for all coastal territory up to a certain distance from the eastern shoreline of North America, from 38°N to 45°N. The northern boundary was thus slightly farther north than the current Maine–New Brunswick border, and the southern border intentionally overlapped with the Virginia Company of London ("London Company") from the 38th parallel (near the current Maryland–Virginia border) to the 41st (near the current Connecticut–New York border in Long Island Sound). Neither colony was allowed to settle within 100 miles of the other. The Plymouth Company's patent fell into disuse after the failure of the Popham Colony in what is now Maine. Meanwhile, the Plymouth Colony had settled outside the territory of the London company due to navigational difficulties. The Plymouth Company was reorganized as the Plymouth Council for New England, and given a new royal sea-to-sea charter for all North American territory from 40° North (just east between present-day Philadelphia and Trenton, New Jersey) and 48° N (thus including all of modern-day New Brunswick, Nova Scotia, and Prince Edward Island). The Plymouth Colony was granted land patents between 1621 and 1630 from the Council to legitimize its settlement, though it maintained political independence under the Mayflower Compact.

The Plymouth Council for New England made sub grants to various entities before it was surrendered to the crown in 1635 and ceased to operate as a corporate entity.

The Sheffield Patent granted the use of Cape Ann to members of the Plymouth Colony and the Dorchester Company. The fishing colony there failed, but led to the foundation of Salem, Massachusetts. The bankrupt Dorchester Company's lands were reissued as part of a larger grant to the Massachusetts Bay Company. Massachusetts Bay obtained in 1628/29 a sea-to-sea patent for all lands and islands from three miles north of the Merrimack River (roughly the current Massachusetts–New Hampshire border), to three miles south of the extents of the Charles River and Massachusetts Bay. The Charles River starts in Hopkinton (in the middle of the territory) but flows in a circuitous path southeast to near present-day Bellingham on the modern Rhode Island border. Land belonging to any other colonies as of November 3, 1629, was excluded from the grant.

The boundary between the Massachusetts Bay Colony and Plymouth Colony was settled in 1639, and today forms most of the border between Norfolk County to the north and Plymouth and Bristol counties to the south.

In 1622, Sir Ferdinando Gorges obtained a patent for the Province of Maine, lands north of the Massachusetts Bay border near the Merrimack River, up to the Kennebec River. This was soon split at the Piscataqua River, with the southern portion eventually becoming the Province of New Hampshire. The northern portion came under Massachusetts Bay control in the 1640s. In 1664, James, Duke of York, obtained a charter for land from the Kennebec to the St. Croix River, joining it to his Province of New York. New Hampshire was joined with Massachusetts Bay from 1641 to 1679 and during the dominion period (1686–1692).

The 1629 charter of Massachusetts Bay was canceled by a judgment of the high court of chancery of England, June 18, 1684.

The Province of Massachusetts Bay was formed in 1691–92 by the British monarchs William III and Mary II. It included the lands of the Massachusetts Bay Colony, the Plymouth Colony, the Province of Maine (including the eastern territories that had been part of Province of New York), and Nova Scotia (which included present-day New Brunswick and Prince Edward Island). Dukes County, Massachusetts (Martha's Vineyard and the Elizabeth Islands), and Nantucket were also transferred from the Province of New York. In 1696, Nova Scotia was restored to France (who called it Acadia), but the northern and eastern boundaries of Maine would not be fixed until the 1840s.

=== New Hampshire boundary ===
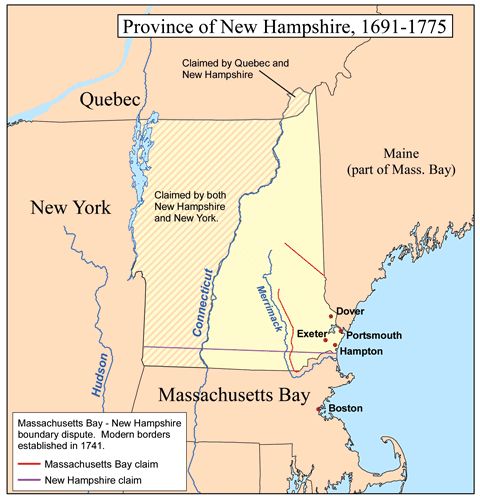
The disputed boundary between Massachusetts Bay Company and the Province of New Hampshire.

The Province of New Hampshire received a separate royal charter in 1679, but the language defining the southern border with Massachusetts Bay referenced the Merrimack River in an ambiguous way:

all that parte of New England in America lying and extending from the greate River commonly called Monomack als Merrimack on the northpart and from three Miles Northward of the said River to the Atlantick or Western Sea or Ocean on the South part [Pacific Ocean]

The result was disagreement over the northern boundary of Massachusetts that was often ignored by its governors because in those years they governed both Massachusetts and New Hampshire. Massachusetts claimed land west of the Merrimack as calculated from the headwaters of the river (which early colonial officials claimed to be the outlet of Lake Winnipesaukee in modern-day Franklin, New Hampshire), but New Hampshire claimed that its southern boundary was the line of latitude three miles north of the river's mouth. The parties appealed to King George II of Great Britain, who ordered the dispute be settled by agreement between the parties. Commissioners from both colonies met at Hampton, New Hampshire in 1737, but were unable to reach agreement.

In 1740, the King settled the dispute in a surprising manner, by declaring "that the northern boundary of Massachusetts be a similar curve line pursuing the course of the Merrimack River at three miles distance on the north side thereof, beginning at the Atlantic Ocean and ending at a point due north of a place called Pawtucket Falls [now Lowell, Massachusetts], and by a straight line drawn from thence west till it meets his Majesty's other governments." This ruling favored New Hampshire and actually gave it a strip of land 50 miles beyond its claim. Massachusetts declined to do a physical survey, so New Hampshire laid markers on its own.

=== Rhode Island eastern border ===
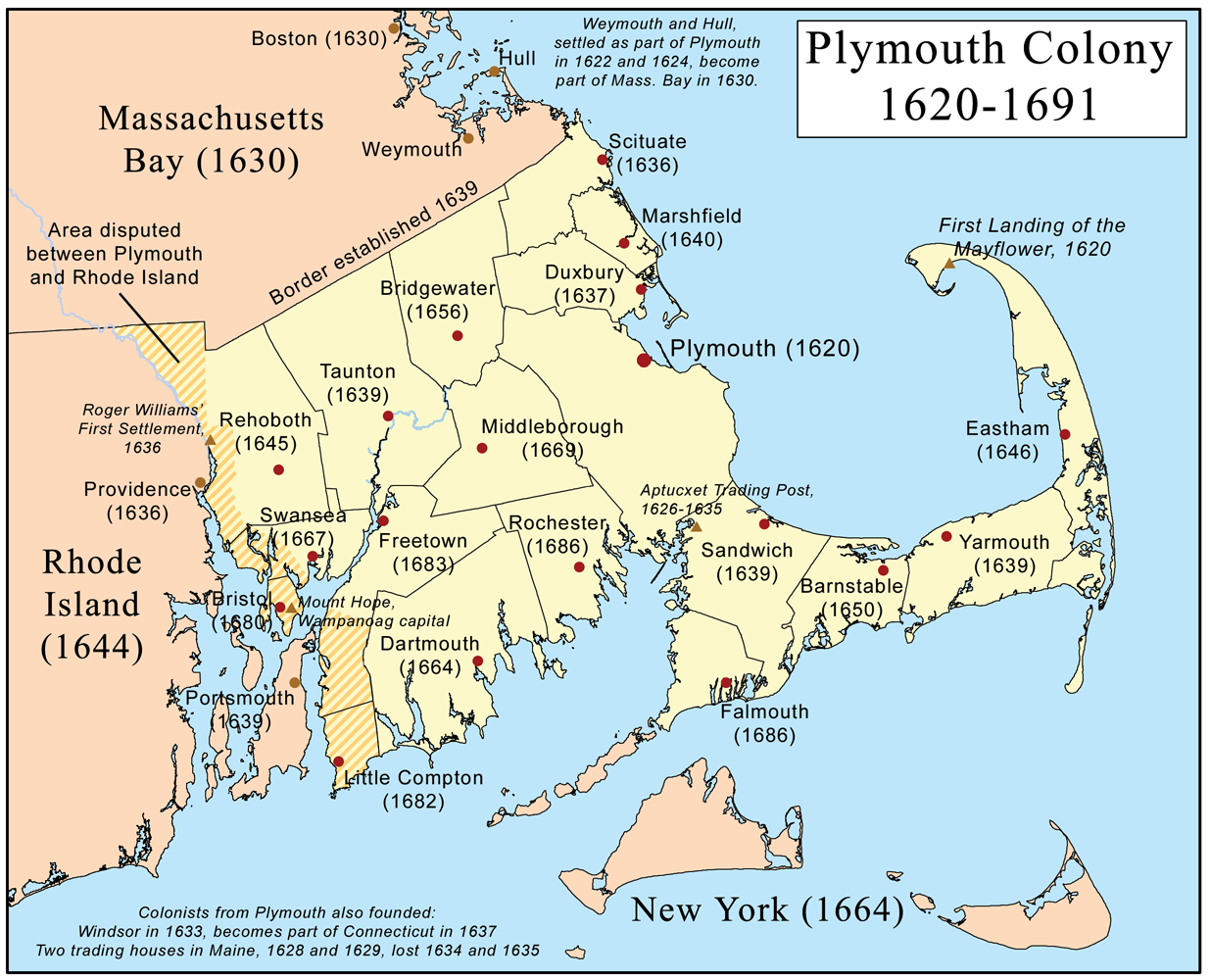
Early settlements and boundaries of the Plymouth Colony

In 1641, the Plymouth Colony (at the time separate from the Massachusetts Bay Colony) purchased from the Indians a large tract of land which today includes the northern half of East Providence (from Watchemoket to Rumford), Rehoboth, Massachusetts, Seekonk, Massachusetts, and part of Pawtucket, Rhode Island. In 1645, John Brown of Plymouth bought a considerably smaller piece of land from the Indians, which today comprises the southern part of East Providence (Riverside), Barrington, Rhode Island, and a small part of Swansea, Massachusetts. Finally, in 1661, Plymouth completed the "North Purchase", from which Cumberland, Rhode Island, Attleboro, Massachusetts, and North Attleborough, Massachusetts, were later to be formed. The whole territory, which also included parts of modern Somerset, Massachusetts, and Warren, Bristol, and Woonsocket in Rhode Island, was at the time called "Rehoboth". The center of "Old Rehoboth" was within the borders of modern East Providence, Rhode Island.

By the 1650s, Massachusetts Bay, the Colony of Rhode Island (not yet unified with Providence) the Connecticut Colony, and two different land companies all claimed what is now Washington County, Rhode Island, what was referred to as Narragansett Country. Massachusetts Bay had conquered Block Island in 1636 in retaliation for the murder of a trader at the start of the Pequot War, and Massachusetts families settled there in 1661. The Plymouth Colony's land grant specified its western boundary as the Narragansett River; it is unclear whether this referred to the Pawcatuck River (on the current Connecticut–Rhode Island Border) or Narragansett Bay (much farther east, near the modern-day Rhode Island–Massachusetts border).

In 1663, Rhode Island obtained a patent extending its territory in certain places three miles east of Narragansett Bay. In 1664, a royal commission appointed by King Charles II of England denied the claims of Massachusetts and Plymouth to land west of Narragansett Bay, granting jurisdiction to the newly unified Colony of Rhode Island and Providence Plantations (pending resolution of the claims of Connecticut). However, the claims of Plymouth to all lands east of Narragansett Bay were upheld, and so the border was set in practice.

The 1691 charter unified Massachusetts Bay with Plymouth Colony (including Rehoboth) and said that the combined territory would extend as far south as "Our Collonyes of Rhode Island Connecticut and the Narragansett Countrey" (Narragansett Country).

In 1693, the monarchs William III and Mary II issued a patent extending Rhode Island's territory to three miles "east and northeast" of Narragansett Bay, conflicting with the claims of Plymouth Colony. This enlarged the area of conflict between Rhode Island and the Province of Massachusetts.

The issue was not addressed until 1740, when Rhode Island appealed to King George II of Great Britain. Royal commissioners from both colonies were appointed in 1741, and decided in favor of Rhode Island. The King affirmed the settlement in 1746 after appeals from both colonies. The royally approved three-mile boundary moved several towns on the eastern shore of Narragansett Bay (east of the mouth of the Blackstone River) from Massachusetts to Rhode Island.

This included what is now Bristol County, Rhode Island (the towns of Barrington, Bristol, and Warren), along with Tiverton, Little Compton, and Cumberland, Rhode Island (which was carved out of Attleborough, Massachusetts). East Freetown, which was left on the Massachusetts side of the border, was officially purchased by Freetown, Massachusetts, from Tiverton in 1747.

Commissioners from Rhode Island had the new boundary surveyed in 1746 (without consulting Massachusetts), based on six reference points, from each of which a distance was measured 3 miles inland. Massachusetts accepted this border until 1791, when its own surveyors found that the Rhode Island surveyors had "encroached" on Massachusetts territory by a few hundred feet in certain places. (Rhode Island disagreed.) Of particular concern was the boundary near Fall River, Massachusetts, which would later fall in the middle of a thickly settled area of high taxable value.

In 1812, after a court case involving the Massachusetts border, the western half of Old Rehoboth was set off as a separate township called Seekonk, Massachusetts, leaving the eastern part as Rehoboth, Massachusetts. Old Rehoboth's town center now became the heart of Old Seekonk.

In 1832, Rhode Island filed a case with the U.S. Supreme Court, but after six years of deliberations, it was dismissed. The court decided it did not have the jurisdiction to rule on the matter.

In 1844, and 1845, commissioners were once again authorized to survey and mark the boundary from Wrentham to the Atlantic Ocean, to address the inaccuracies of the 1746 survey. A report was issued in 1848, but the Massachusetts legislature refused to agree to the proposed solution after petitions from residents of Fall River.

Both states filed bills of equity with the Supreme Court in 1852, and after more surveying and negotiation, a decree was issued on December 16, 1861. On March 1, 1862, when the Supreme Court ruling became effective, the western part of Old Seekonk (all of which was on the eastern shore of the Blackstone River) was ceded by Massachusetts and incorporated as East Providence, Rhode Island. Part of North Providence, Rhode Island, was also combined with the former Pawtucket, Massachusetts and a sliver of Seekonk to form the modern Pawtucket, Rhode Island. A small amount of land was also added to Westport, Massachusetts. The southern boundary of Fall River, Massachusetts, was moved from Columbia Street to State Avenue, expanding its territory. The Supreme Court made these adjustments not in conformance with King George's instructions, but to unify the thickly settled areas of Pawtucket and Fall River under the jurisdiction of a single state.

The 1861–2 boundary was slightly redefined in 1897, using stone markers instead of high-water levels. The physical survey was performed in 1898, and ratified by both states.

=== Rhode Island northern border ===
In 1710–11, commissioners from the Colony of Rhode Island and Providence Plantations and the Province of Massachusetts Bay agreed that the stake planted in 1642 by Nathaniel Woodward and Solomon Saffery at Burnt Swamp Corner on the plains of Wrentham, Massachusetts, said to be at 41°55′N and thought to be three miles south of the southernmost part of the Charles River, would represent the starting point for the border.

The line extending west from the stake was surveyed in 1719, but inaccurately.

In 1748, Rhode Island appointed a commission to survey the line from the stake to the Connecticut border, but Massachusetts failed to send a delegation. The surveyors could not find the 1642 stake, and so marked a line from three miles south, by their reckoning, of "Poppatolish Pond" (presumably Populatic Pond, near Norfolk Airpark in Norfolk, Massachusetts). It was discovered that the Woodward and Saffery stake was considerably farther south than three miles from the Charles River.

Rhode Island claimed that its commissioners had made a mistake in basing the border on the 1642 stake, and in 1832 filed a case with the Supreme Court of the United States. In 1846, the Court ruled in favor of Massachusetts. The same surveyors that marked the eastern boundary the previous year then marked the northern boundary, filing their report in 1848. Rhode Island accepted the markings as the legal boundary on the condition that Massachusetts do the same, but the Commonwealth failed to do so until 1865. But by that time, Rhode Island claimed that the 1861 Supreme Court case had changed matters so much as to render the "line of 1848" unacceptable.

=== Connecticut border ===
The town of Springfield was settled in 1636 by William Pynchon (as Agawam Plantation), encompassing the modern towns of Westfield, Southwick, West Springfield, Agawam, Chicopee, Holyoke, Wilbraham, Ludlow and Longmeadow in Massachusetts, and Enfield, Suffield, Somers, and East Windsor in Connecticut. It was connected to the Atlantic and major avenues of trade by the Connecticut River, which ran past Hartford and through the territory of the Connecticut Colony. Initially, Springfield's founders attended the Connecticut Colony meetings held in Hartford; however, relations quickly soured between the strong-minded leaders of each settlement, the iconoclastic William Pynchon of Springfield and Puritan Reverend Thomas Hooker of Hartford. Pynchon proved to be a very savvy businessman, and his settlement quickly eclipsed the Connecticut towns in trade with the Natives. In 1640, during a grain shortage, Hooker and other Connecticut leaders gave Pynchon permission to buy grain for them; however, because the Indians were refusing to sell at reasonable prices, Pynchon refused the Indians' offers. Pynchon's perceived greed infuriated Hartford; however, Pynchon explained that he was merely trying to keep market prices steady so that colonists need not pay exorbitant amounts in the future. Infuriated, Hartford sent famed Indian-killer Captain John Mason up to Pynchon's settlement "with money in one hand and a sword in the other." Mason threatened the Natives by Springfield with war if they did not sell grain at the prices he demanded. Pynchon was disgusted by this behavior, as he had enjoyed a congenial relationship with the Natives – and Mason's threats made him look bad. Mason believed that Natives were untrustworthy, and thus exchanged some "hard words" with Pynchon before leaving Springfield. After Mason left, settlers of Agawam Plantation rallied in support of Pynchon. In 1640, they voted to annex their settlement – with arguably the best position on the Connecticut River, near Enfield Falls, surrounded by fertile farmland and friendly Natives – to the faraway government in Boston, rather than the nearby government in Hartford. (Springfield had been settled by permission of the Massachusetts General Court, so Massachusetts assumed it had jurisdiction over Pynchon's settlement anyway; however, they renamed it Springfield in Pynchon's honor).

In 1641, Connecticut founded a trading post at Woronoke, which was in what was strongly considered to be Massachusetts territory (now Westfield). Massachusetts complained, and Connecticut demanded that Springfield pay taxes to support the upkeep of the fort at the mouth of the river, in the Saybrook Colony. Springfield's magistrate, William Pynchon, would have been amenable to the tax if Springfield could have representation at the fort at Saybrook; however, Connecticut refused Springfield's request for representation. Pynchon appealed to Boston, which responded to Connecticut by threatening to charge Connecticut traders for the use of the port of Boston on which they heavily depended.

To assert its sovereignty on the northern Connecticut River, the Massachusetts Bay Colony sent Nathaniel Woodward and Solomon Saffery to survey and mark the boundary. They accidentally marked the boundary with Rhode Island significantly farther than the royally decreed three miles south of the southernmost part of the Charles River. Instead of traversing the territory of Massachusetts by land, they sailed around and up the Connecticut River, calculating the same latitude at which they had misplaced the stake on the Rhode Island border. This compounded the error even further, resulting in a four to seven mile discrepancy between where the border should have been and where it was marked, and awarding more territory to Massachusetts Bay than it had been granted by its charter. Although it was suspicious of this survey, Connecticut would not even receive a charter until 1662, and so the dispute would lie dormant for several decades.

The towns of Woodstock, Suffield, Enfield, and Somers were incorporated by Massachusetts, and mainly settled by migrants from the Massachusetts Bay and Plymouth Colonies. In 1686, Suffield and Enfield (incorporated in Massachusetts) were in a dispute over town territory with Windsor and Simsbury (incorporated in Connecticut, and which then included Granby). Massachusetts did not agree to a re-survey, so Connecticut hired John Butler and William Whitney to do the job. They found the southernmost part of the Charles River, and then traveled by land westward. Their 1695 report found that the 1642 line had been drawn too far south.

Consternation ensued. Abortive pleas to England were made in 1702. In 1713, a joint commission awarded control of Springfield-area towns to Massachusetts (without consulting the residents of those towns), compensating Connecticut with an equal amount of land further north. But the inhabitants of the Connecticut River border towns petitioned to be part of Connecticut in 1724, perhaps due to high taxes in Massachusetts or the greater civil liberties granted in the Connecticut charter.

In 1747, Woodstock petitioned the General Assembly of Connecticut to be admitted to the colony because the transfer of lands from Massachusetts in 1713 had not been authorized by The Crown. Suffield and Enfield soon followed, and the legislature accepted them in May 1749, and declared the 1713 compromise null and void. Massachusetts continued to assert sovereignty.

In 1770, Southwick, Massachusetts, was granted independence from Westfield, Massachusetts. In May 1774, residents in southern Southwick also petitioned Connecticut for entry and secession from northern Southwick, on the grounds they were south of the royally approved border of the Massachusetts Bay Colony (three miles south of the Charles River). As a compromise, the area west of Congamond Lake remained in Massachusetts, and the area of Massachusetts east of the lake joined Suffield and became part of Connecticut.

In 1791, and 1793, commissioners were sent from both states to survey the boundary line yet again, but were unable to agree until a compromise was reached in 1803–04. Massachusetts accepted the nullification of the 1713 compromise and the loss of the border towns, but regained the portion of southern Southwick west of the lake. This resulted in the modern boundary with Connecticut, a relatively straight east–west line except for the "Southwick Jog", a small, mostly rectangular piece of Massachusetts surrounded by Connecticut on three sides.

=== New York border ===
Massachusetts claimed all territory to the Pacific Ocean, based on its 1629 charter, but the Province of New York claimed the west bank of the Connecticut River (passing through Springfield, Massachusetts) as its eastern boundary, based on 1664 and 1674 grants to the Duke of York. The 1705 Westenhook Patent from the governor of New York allocated land west of the Housatonic River to specific individuals, resulting in ownership conflicts.

In 1773, the western boundary of Massachusetts was settled with New York in its present location, and surveyed in 1787, following the line of magnetic north at the time. The starting point was a 1731 marker at the Connecticut–New York border, 20 miles inland from the Hudson River.

Massachusetts relinquished sovereignty over its western lands (east of the Great Lakes) to New York in the Treaty of Hartford in 1786, but retained the economic right to buy the Boston Ten Townships from Native Americans before any other party. These purchase rights were sold to private individuals in 1788. The Commonwealth also ceded its claim to far western lands (Michigan and all other land to the Pacific Ocean) to Congress in 1785.

In 1853, a small triangle of land in the southwest corner of the Commonwealth, known as Boston Corner, was ceded from Mount Washington, Massachusetts, to Ancram, New York. The mountainous terrain made it difficult for Massachusetts authorities to enforce the law there, making the neighborhood a haven for outlaws and prize-fighters. Residents petitioned for the transfer to allow New York authorities to clean up the hamlet.

=== Maine ===
From 1658 to 1820 Maine was an integral part of Massachusetts. In 1820, Maine was separated from Massachusetts (with its consent) and admitted into the Union as an independent state, as part of the Missouri Compromise. (See the History of Maine for information about its boundaries, including disputes with New Hampshire and Canadian provinces.)

== See also ==
- History of education in Massachusetts
- History of the Massachusetts Turnpike
- History of New England
- List of historical societies in Massachusetts
- Massachusetts Archives
- Massachusetts historical markers
- Native American tribes in Massachusetts
