= Sheffield Patent =

The Sheffield Patent, dated January 1, 1623 (Julian calendar) is a land grant from Edmund Sheffield, 1st Earl of Mulgrave (Sheffeild in the original) of England to Robert Cushman and Edward Winslow (residents of Plymouth Colony) and their associates. It granted them the use of Cape Ann (in present-day Massachusetts) and the neighboring bay and islands, allocating 500 acres (2 km^{2}) for public buildings and 30 acres (120,000 m^{2}) for private use for each settler arriving within the next 70 years.

Cape Ann was subsequently settled by members of the Dorchester Company, which was later absorbed into the Massachusetts Bay Company.
