= Preemption Line =

Divided the aboriginal lands of western New York State

Preemption Line shown in green

The Preemption Line (also spelled Pre-Emption) divided the aboriginal lands of western New York State awarded to New York from those awarded to the Commonwealth of Massachusetts by the Treaty of Hartford of 1786. It was defined as the meridian (north–south) line from the eighty-second milestone of the Pennsylvania–New York survey line at 76° 57' 58" W northward to Lake Ontario.

== Origin and definition ==
By coincidence, the Preemption Line is near the meridian of the Capitol at Washington (77° 00' 33" W of Greenwich), but the popular assumption that the Preemption Line was intended to be on that meridian seems to be a myth, since the District of Columbia had not been surveyed at the time of the 1786 treaty; in fact Benjamin Ellicott helped map and survey the District of Columbia in 1791–1792 and then re-surveyed the Preemption line in 1792 (see below).

The word "preemption" refers to the pre-emptive right that Massachusetts received to negotiate with the native sovereign tribes—pre-empting New York State, and also to the pre-emptive rights of the two state governments with respect to individuals, who were forbidden to negotiate directly with the sovereign tribes without first securing a patent from the respective legislature.

It is bounded on the east (New York portion) by:

- the townships of Galen and Junius of the Central New York Military Tract north of Seneca Lake;
- the Watkins and Flint Purchase south of the township of Reading in Schuyler County;
- In between a narrow strip of land eastward to Seneca Lake purchased by James Watson.

It is bounded on the west (Massachusetts portion) by the Phelps and Gorham Purchase.

=== Timeline ===
Timeline for the history of the preemption line.

- 1628 – King Charles I of England grants land to the Massachusetts Bay Colony which includes what is now New York State.
- 1664 – King Charles II of England grants land to his brother, the Duke of York which also includes what is now New York State.
- 1783 Sep 3 – Treaty of Paris (1783) between US and England ending the American revolution.
- 1784 – Second treaty of Fort Stanwix. This was effectively a peace treaty between the US and the Haudenosaunee (Iroquois) tribes in which they ceded land to the west of New York state to the U.S., but not in what is now New York state, which amounted to some 6,000,000 acres.
- 1786 Dec 16 – Treaty of Hartford – Massachusetts and New York resolve their competing claims to the area of what is now New York State. New York State takes its present shape, and the land in New York west of the (unsurveyed) preemption line is considered part of New York state, but owned by the Haudenosaunee (Iroquois) tribes, with preemptive right of purchase by Massachusetts.
- 1788 Apr 1 – Massachusetts agrees to sell all of its preemptive rights to Oliver Phelps and Nathaniel Gorham of Massachusetts.
- 1788 Jul 8 – Phelps and Gorham purchase from the Haudenosaunee (Iroquois) tribes land amounting to some 2,600,000 acres.
- 1788 Jul 25 – Colonel Hugh Maxwell begins survey of the first (false) preemption line.
- 1792 Nov – Benjamin Ellicott begins survey of the second (true) preemption line.
- 1796 Apr 6 – The second preemption line is accepted by New York State.

== The Old and New Preemption Lines ==
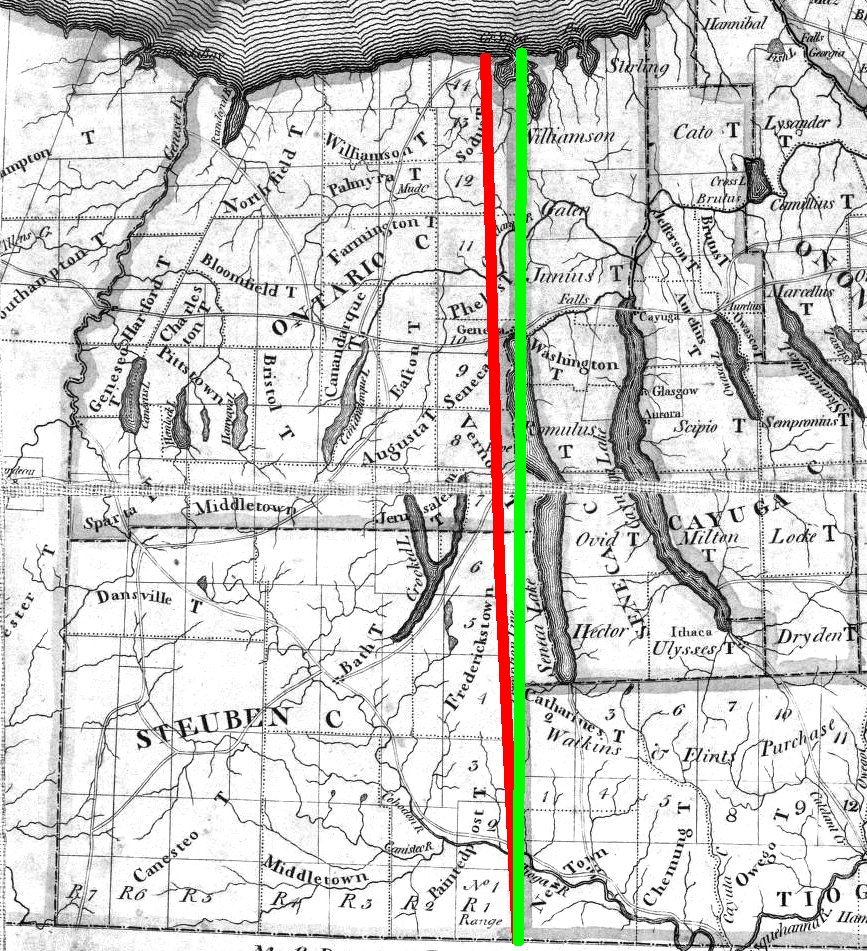
A portion of a map of the State of New York, by Simon Dewitt (1804) with the old preemption line emphasized in red, and the new preemption line emphasized in green.

An interesting point is that there are two pre-emption lines: the Old and New (to the east of the Old); the area between is called the Gore (referring to a dressmaker's term for a wedge-shaped piece). This is because very soon after the original survey of 1788 it was suspected that this survey was in error, so a resurvey was commissioned in 1792. It showed that the first surveyors had used defective methods (or, as some have alleged, but not proven, fraudulent methods) so that the line, although beginning at the correct Pennsylvania boundary stone, was deflected about 2° west of north, hence the wedge shape (increasing in width to the north). It is not a simple error, however; once the survey was about two miles west of the correct line it then ran closer to true north. The original error was in favor of New York, which issued titles in the Gore; most notably, the current city of Geneva was incorrectly assigned. The new survey was accepted, as it was performed with a high-precision German transit by Benjamin Ellicott, who had just assisted in the initial survey of the District of Columbia (see Boundary Markers of the Original District of Columbia).

The magnitude of the error can be appreciated at Geneva: the true (new) line is at about the midpoint of Seneca Lake at the Seneca–Ontario County boundary, whereas the false (old) line is the present-day Pre-emption Road, which forms the western limits of the City of Geneva, about two miles west.

== The Preemption Lines on the ground today ==
Both begin at the same point: the eighty-second milestone of the Pennsylvania–New York survey line, located on Widger Hill Road near Millerton, PA at 42°00′04.58″N 76.0°57.0′57.52″W.

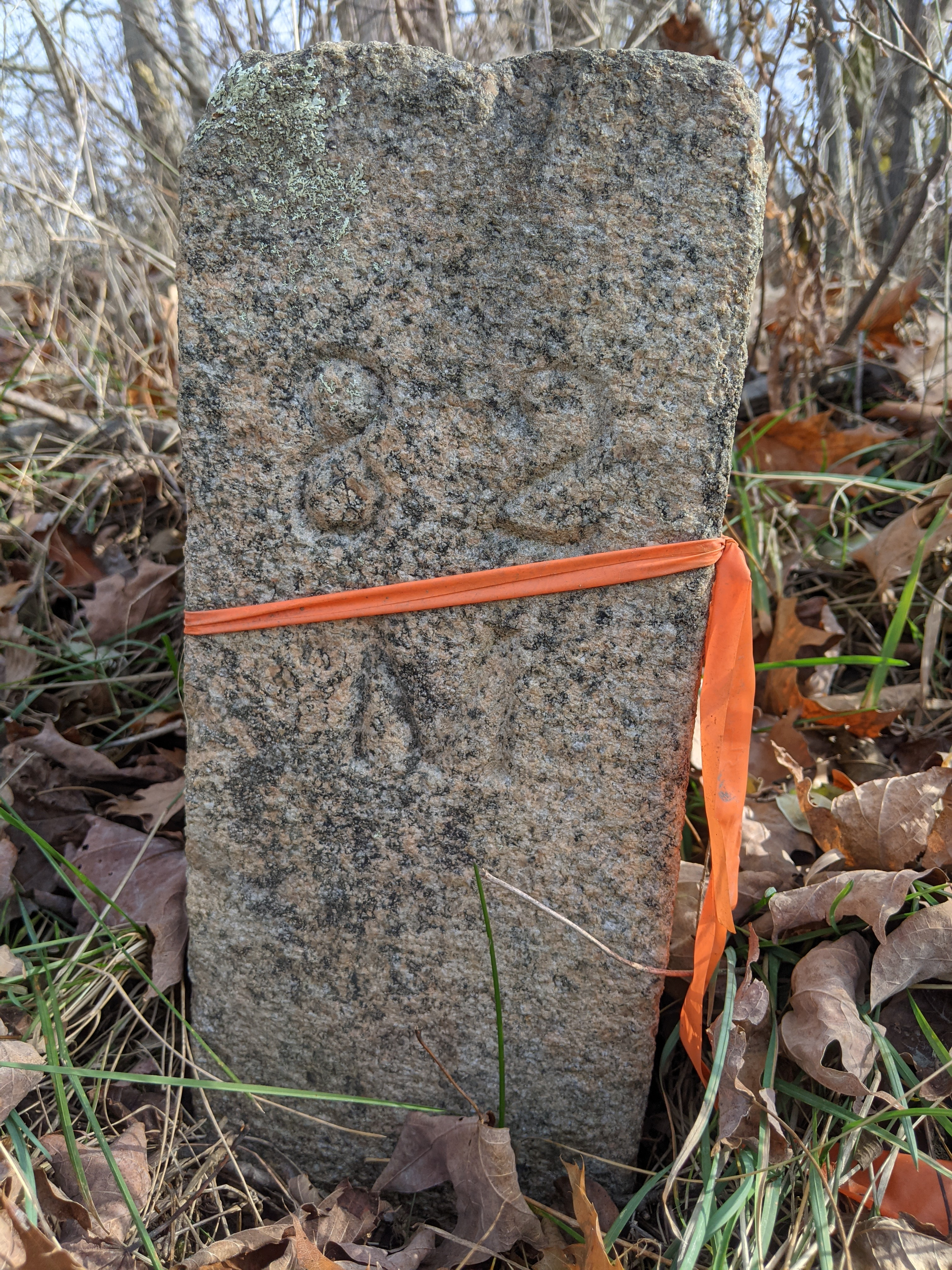
The NY/PA border is marked at 1-mile intervals with stone markers

=== Old Preemption Line ===
There is no trace of this line south of Schuyler County, probably because no settlement took place in this area prior to the resurvey. In Schuyler County it forms the west line of the town of Reading, for most of this length along Pre-emption Road. It continues as the short north–south portion of the boundary between Schuyler (west) and Yates Counties along this road, and then divides the Yates County towns of Barrington (west) and Starkey (east) to their tri-point with the town of Milo, where the road also ends. A portion of road through Milo Center to the Keuka Lake outlet is on the line. It is marked again in Ontario County by the Pre-emption Road through the towns of Geneva and Phelps; this road makes some local deviations from the line. The Pre-emption Road continues a short distance into Wayne County as far as the new Erie Canal; it is not marked farther north.

=== New Preemption Line ===
This line forms the boundary between Chemung (east) and Steuben (west) Counties as well as a small north–south portion of the border between Chemung (east) and Schuyler (west) Counties at the former's northwest corner near Beaver Dams. It then forms the line between the towns of Orange (west) and Montour (east) in Schuyler County; the only roads that follows the line in this section are at the very beginning north a few miles on Widger Hill Road, and a mile of Locust Lane in Sugar Hill State Forest.

There is an informational marker at the point where the line crosses NY 352 and the Keuka Outlet Trail. The line has no trace in Yates County; it runs north–south through Seneca Lake from a point north of Dresden.

It next appears at the north end of Seneca Lake and forms the boundary between Seneca (east) and Ontario (west) Counties to the tri-point with Wayne County; in this section it forms Pre-emption Road and most of West Town Line Road.

In Wayne County it continues north as the line between the towns of Lyons and Sodus (west) and Galen, Rose and Huron (east); small sections of roadway denote its path. The line then runs through and terminates in Lake Ontario's Sodus Bay.
