= Genesee County Courthouse =

- U.S. National Register of Historic Places
- U.S. Historic district – Contributing property
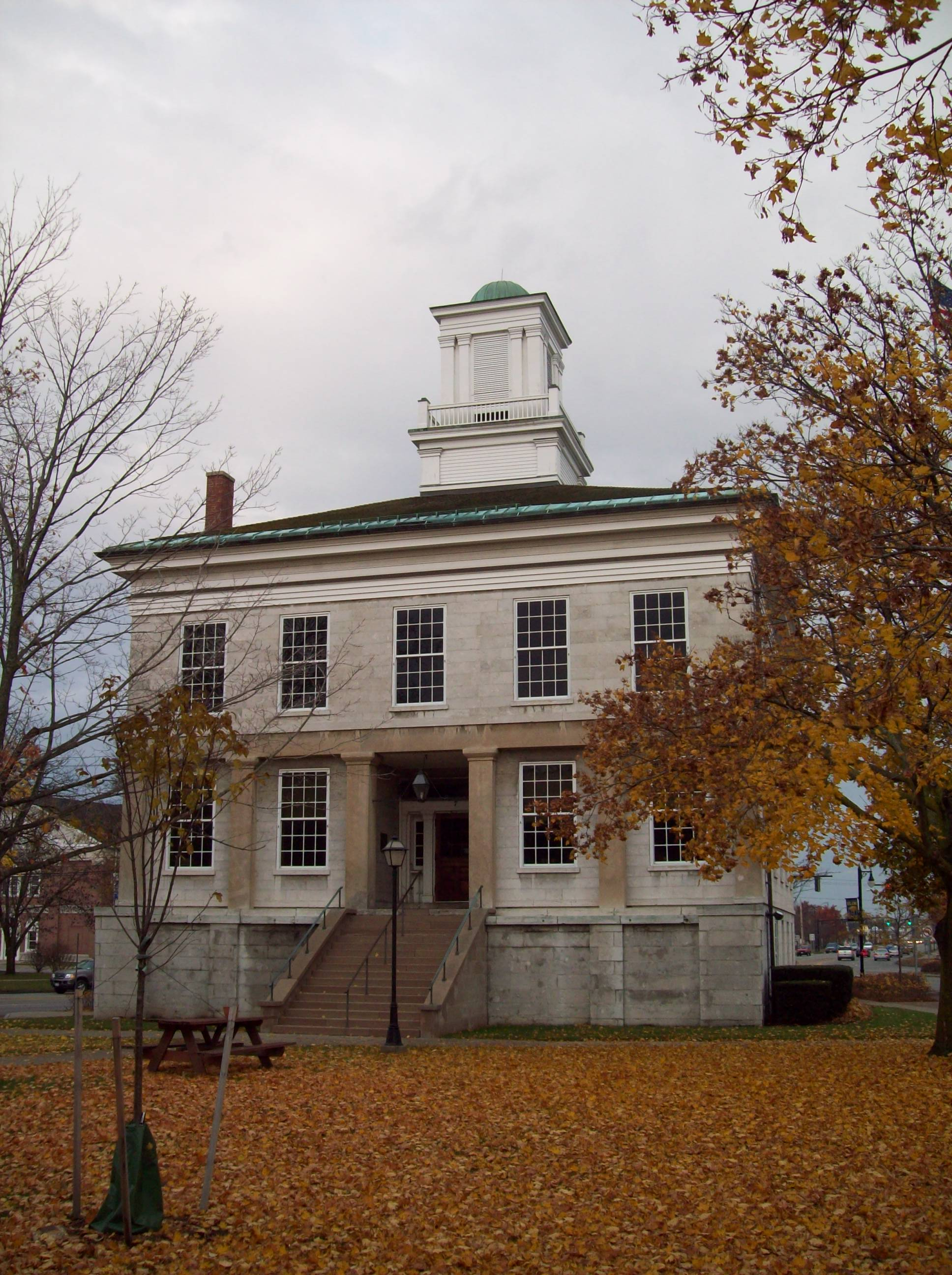
- East elevation, 2009

- Location within New York Location within the United States
- Interactive map showing the location of Genesee County Courthouse
- Location: Batavia, NY
- Coordinates: 42°59′51″N 78°11′12″W
- Built: 1841
- Architectural style: Greek Revival
- Part of: Genesee County Courthouse Historic District
- NRHP reference No.: 73001193
- Added to NRHP: June 18, 1973

The Genesee County Courthouse is located at the intersection of Main (New York state routes 5 and 33) and Ellicott (NY 63) streets in Batavia, New York, United States. It is a three-story Greek Revival limestone structure built in the 1840s.

It replaced an older timber frame courthouse near the current site, which served what was at that time the entire Holland Purchase, the vast tract that is today Western New York. At the time the courthouse was built, the county had been reduced to its current size by the creation of 10 other counties from the purchase. Construction materials were all sourced locally.

Later it underwent some minor renovations. While Genesee County has subsequently built additional court facilities nearby where most judicial activity takes place, it is still used for some court purposes as well as offices for the county manager, attorney and the meeting place of the county legislature. In 1973 it was listed on the National Register of Historic Places. Nine years later, in 1982, when the Genesee County Courthouse Historic District was added to the Register, the courthouse was again included as a contributing property.

== Building ==
The courthouse is located in the west corner of the triangular lot with Main on the north, Ellicott on the south and Court Street to the east. It is prominently visible to traffic approaching down West Main Street from the west. The block contains one other building, a large Colonial Revival brick structure also used by the county. Walkways connect the two, and surrounding sidewalks, amid a large lawn. West of the courthouse, at the fork of Main and Ellicott, is the large granite Soldier's Monument, with a statue of General Emory Upton.

Other public buildings dominate the neighboring streets. The post office, old county jail and Batavia's old city hall, all also contributing properties to the historic district, are to the north, across Main. On the northwest is city police headquarters. Northeast is the new city hall and Genesee Country Mall. Other public buildings are on the south, with Tonawanda Creek behind them. All these buildings are surrounded by parking lots.

Two blocks west along West Main is the Holland Land Office Museum, a National Historic Landmark. The commercial areas of downtown Batavia begin two blocks east along both streets. To the north, south and west are residential areas.

The building itself is a five-by-five-bay structure with load-bearing limestone walls. On the east (front) side it is two and a half stories high, reaching a full three on the west. The lower level is set off by a belt course that also serves as a water table. Atop the building is a hipped roof with slate shingles trimmed in copper at the roofline. A cupola with bell from the original courthouse is in the center, and a brick chimney rises from the southeast corner.

Across the first floor of the east facade are six large stone pilasters with Doric capitals. All the bays save for the centrally located main entrance have 12-over-12 double-hung sash windows. At the roofline is an architrave of three narrow bands topped by a plain wide frieze below the projecting cornice.

The lower tier of the cupola has clapboard siding with corner pilasters and a frieze and projecting molded cornice of its own. Atop that is a balustrade surrounding the top tier, where each face has two Doric pilasters flanking a louvered vent. Above its frieze and cornice is a copper dome.

Stone steps with center and side iron guardrails rise to the deeply recessed main entrance. The front door is framed by more Doric pilasters, sidelights and a transom above its own cornice. It opens into a central hallway with offices on either side.

At the far end is a double stair that merges into one before it reaches the second floor. The main courtroom, with coved ceiling covered in acoustical tiles, is on that level along with two judges' chambers. Wainscoting and door and window trim are apparently original. The third floor has been converted from the county clerk's offices to an open meeting room for the county legislature.

== History ==
Joseph Ellicott supervised the building of the first courthouse in 1802 on behalf of the Holland Land Company, for which he was agent. It was a two-story frame structure located to the east of the present building, near the site of the county building on the opposite side of the triangle. He had chosen what became Batavia for his headquarters due to its location at the convergence of major Iroquois trails through the region, two of which became Main and Ellicott streets and the state highways that follow them.

The original building had jail facilities in the basement, offices on the first floor and its courtroom upstairs. Like its successor, it was topped with a cupola. Local lore holds that David McCracken, a prosperous early resident with a reputation for playing practical jokes, was surprised that the land company had not bought a bell to go with it, and commissioned a bell on his own from a foundry in New Haven, Connecticut. After taking delivery, he hung it from a pole between two trees and proceeded to ring it in the early hours of one morning, awakening the entire village. Ellicott asked if the bell was for sale, and when McCracken said yes, the land agent bought it from him at that very moment. It has hung in the courthouse ever since.

As the Holland Purchase was settled more extensively, Genesee County, which had originally been coterminous with the lands, was subdivided into the other ten counties in the region. As the county's boundaries changed, this created pressure to relocate the county seat somewhere more central to the remaining county. This ended with the creation of the last county, Wyoming, to Genesee's immediate south, in 1841, leaving Batavia once again centrally located within the county.

The county's Board of Supervisors had petitioned the state legislature for money to build a new courthouse, which was authorized that same year. Its Greek Revival design, typical for public buildings of the period, was an expanded version of the original courthouse, later to serve as town and village hall. The Onondaga limestone was quarried locally. The wall stones came from nearby Le Roy, already emerging as a center for that material, and the pillars and capitals from Lockport, the seat of Niagara County to the northwest.

Local craftsmen worked on the construction. The building was finished early in 1843 and the first court sessions were held later that year. At first the Board of Supervisors allowed all sorts of public meetings to be held in the building, but by 1851 they had ordered the sheriff to allow only county meetings. The two building commissioners who had overseen construction later served as judges, one not leaving the bench until the early 20th century.

The first renovations were made in 1862, when some aspects of the interior were altered and fireproofing was added to benefit the county clerk. In 1918 the original courthouse, since renamed Ellicott Hall, burned down. The bell was saved and moved to the cupola in the current courthouse.

Major renovations took place in 1932. The front, originally a recessed full-width porch with freestanding columns, was enclosed to create more office space. The columns became pilasters. Inside, the upstairs courtroom was reconfigured into a north-south access and the bench was moved accordingly. These renovations cost $58,000 ($1,369,000 in contemporary dollars).

In 1957 the exterior walls were sandblasted. A more extensive 1975 project spent $155,000 ($927,000 in contemporary dollars) to add a fire alarm and sprinkler system, lightning protection, gutter downspouts and cleaned the outside stone again. The windows and roofing were replaced, along with the wooden trim. The wooden supports for the bell were replaced, and its rope gave way to an electrical system. Air conditioning and an elevator were added in 1999.

There have been no other substantial changes to the building. Currently it serves as offices for the county manager and the assistant county manager, as well as the county attorney. The nine-member county legislature still meets twice a month in the upstairs courtroom.

== See also ==
- National Register of Historic Places listings in Genesee County, New York
- Fellows v. Blacksmith
