= Boston Ten Townships =

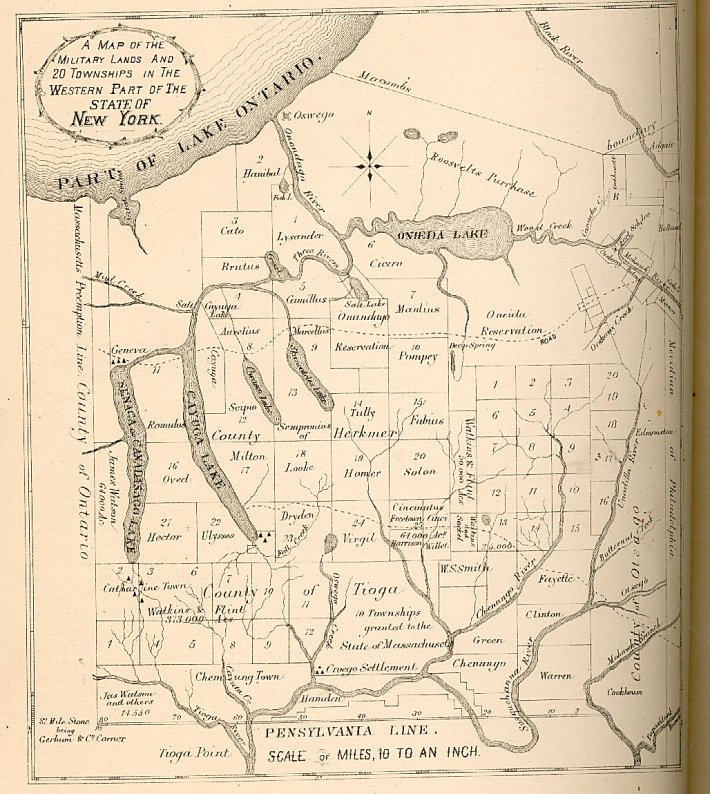
Map of the military lands in 1796; Boston Ten Townships in south center.

The Boston Ten Townships refers to an area of 230,400 acres (932 km^{2}) in Tioga County and Broome County, New York State, between the Chenango River (to Chenango Forks) and Tioughnioga River (east boundary) and the west branch of Owego Creek (west boundary), from the Susquehanna River about twenty-five miles northwards; it includes the northern half of the town of Owego and the towns of Newark Valley, Berkshire, and Richford in Tioga County, and a portion of the Broome County towns of Lisle, Nanticoke and Maine east of these. It is bounded on the west by the Watkins and Flint Purchase and a small portion of the original Chemung County, and on the north by the Central New York Military Tract (present-day Cortland County). The boundary between Tioga County and Broome County is very irregular.

The Treaty of Hartford of 1786 settled the western boundary between Massachusetts and New York at the modern largely north–south east of the Hudson River (except for Boston Corners, which was transferred later). As part of the treaty, New York gained undisputed sovereignty over the area, but granted the Commonwealth of Massachusetts the right to purchase the property rights from the local Indians. This right was subsequently purchased in the same year by a company of Boston investors (originally 11, later 60) named the Boston Purchase Company. One of the investors, Colonel David Pixley, came to the area to negotiate with the native inhabitants for the land rights. Most of the investors actually settled in the area, and were soon able to extinguish the Indian claims by purchase from the Oneida; one half-township of Owego (including the village) had already been acquired from the Oneida by James McMaster; some delicate negotiations led to his claim being recognized as the McMaster Patent.
