= Watkins and Flint Purchase =

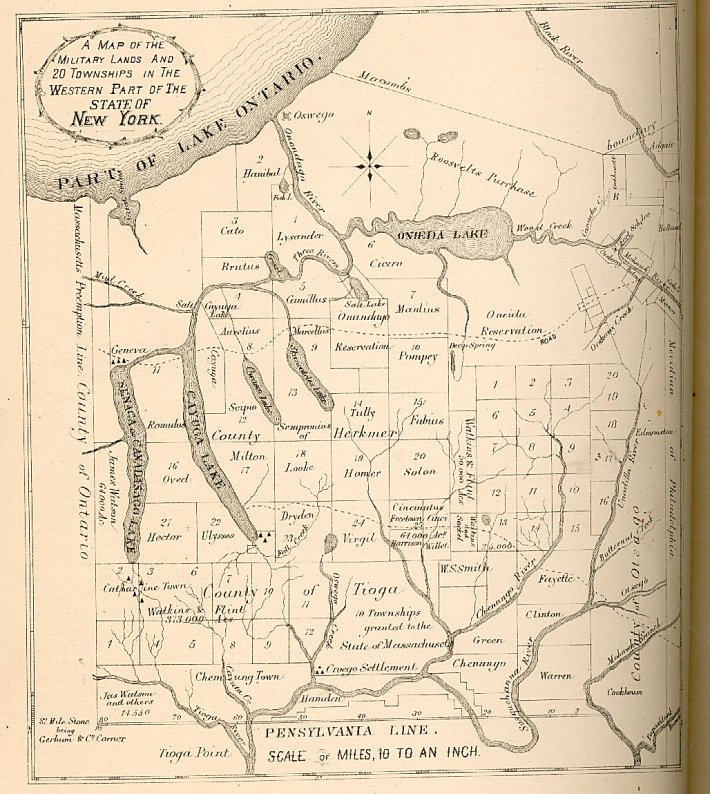
Map of the military lands in 1796; Watkins and Flint purchase in SW corner (numbered 1–12)

The Watkins and Flint Purchase is a tract of land, approximately 300,000 acres (1,200 km^{2}), in the Southern Tier of New York State granted to John W. Watkins and Royal Flint and associates of New York City, in 1794, following an application to the New York Commissioners of the Land-Office in 1791. It is bounded on the north by the Central New York Military Tract, on the east by the Boston Ten Townships, on the west by the Preemption Line which separates it from the Phelps and Gorham Purchase and on the south by an east–west strip north of the Pennsylvania border at 42 degrees north (approximately), which was the original Township of Chemung.

It was originally part of Tioga County and today includes parts of Schuyler County, Chemung County, Tioga County, and the Tompkins County towns of Newfield, Danby and Caroline (not including the northernmost line of lots, which was taken from the Central New York Military Tract town of Dryden).
