= Goiogouen =

Coordinates: 42°50′N 76°41′W

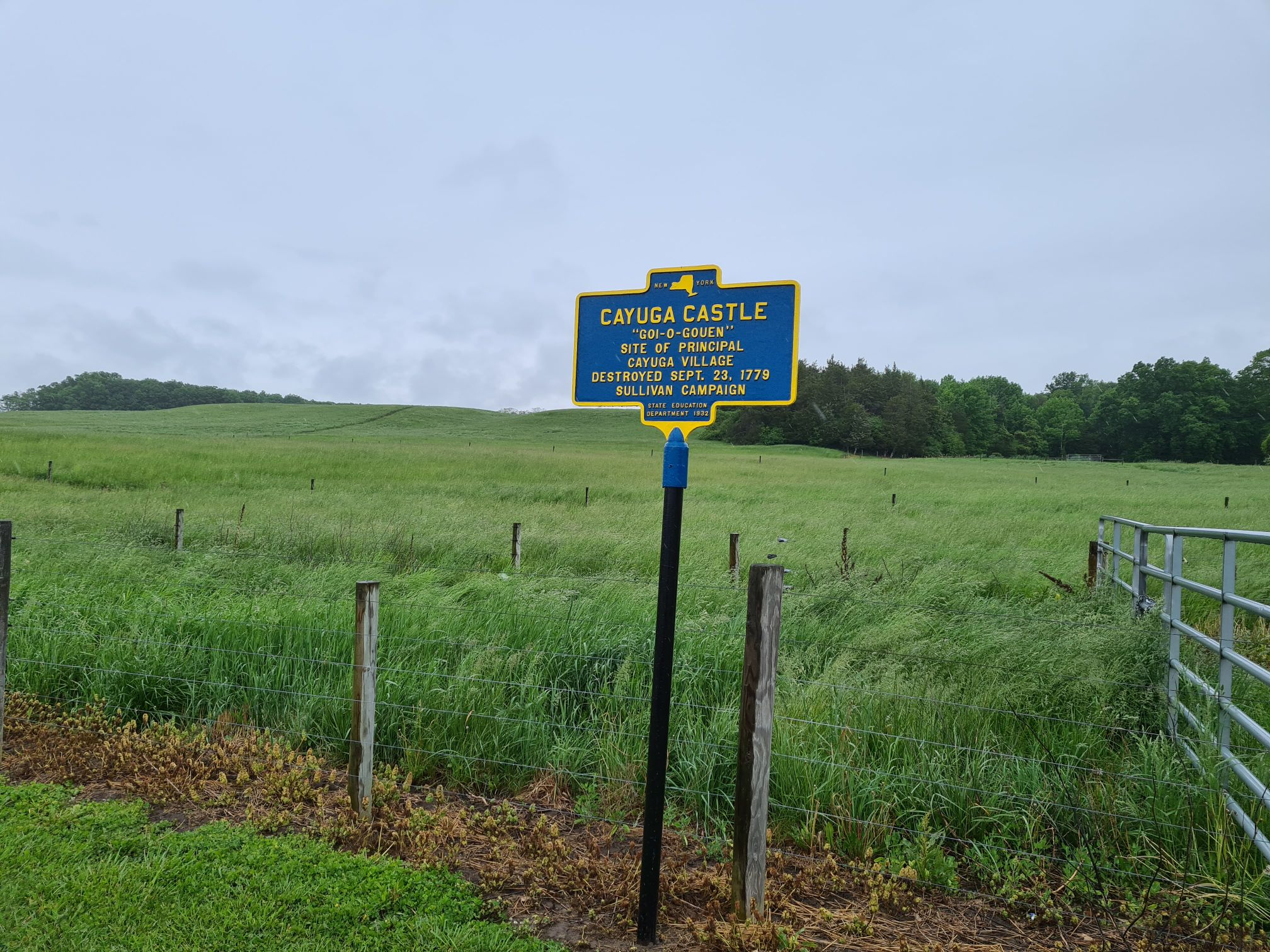
Marker indicating the location of Goiogouen

Goiogouen (also spelled Gayagaanhe and known as Cayuga Castle), was a major village of the Cayuga nation of the Haudenosaunee in west-central New York State. It was located on the eastern shore of Cayuga Lake on the north side of the Great Gully Brook, about 10 miles (16 km) south of the large 17th-century Cayuga town of Tiohero; and approximately along the southern line of the modern-day township of Springport, New York. It was located about four miles (6 km) north from Chonodote, the present-day location of the village of Aurora, New York and about two miles (3 km) south of the village of Union Springs, New York.

Goiogouen was established at least as early as 1656 when the French mission of St. Joseph was founded nearby. It remained occupied through the late 17th century and most of the 18th century. It was abandoned after being destroyed by US forces in 1779, but was reoccupied until 1784.

In 1656, Jesuit missionaries Joseph Chaumanot and René Menard came to the area from Onondaga territory, said to be invited by the Cayuga chief Saonchiogwa. They were followed later by Étienne de Carheil and Pierre Raffeix. The Jesuits built there apparently the first Christian church west of Onondaga territory. Their mission at Goiogouen was named St. Joseph.

At the first visit of the Jesuits, Goioguen was described as "a village [of] long houses with ridge-pole roofs covered with elm bark... in the midst of fields of corn which extended to the edge of the forest." In 1671, Raffeix described the country surrounding Goiogouen as follows:

Goiogouen is the fairest country I have seen in America. It is a tract between two lakes and not exceeding four leagues in width, consisting of almost uninterrupted plains, the woods bordering it are extremely beautiful. Around Goiogouen there are killed more than a thousand deer annually. Fish, salmon, as well as eels and other fish are plentiful. Four leagues from here I saw by the side of a river (Seneca) ten extremely fine salt springs.

At the time of the American Revolution, Goiogouen consisted of "fifteen very large square log houses" (longhouses), deemed to be very well built by the scouting parties of the Sullivan-Clinton Campaign; and "in the vicinity...were one hundred and 10 acres (40,000 m^{2}) of corn; besides apples, peaches, potatoes, turnips, onions, pumpkins, squashes and other vegetables in abundance." The village was destroyed by these American troops on September 23, 1779.

A monument erected in 1929 by New York State stands near the location of Goiogouen.
