= Treaty of Hartford =

Treaty of Hartford can refer to any of three treaties signed in Hartford, Connecticut:

- Treaty of Hartford (1638), divided Pequot territory after their defeat in the Pequot War
- Treaty of Hartford (1650), fixed border between New Netherland and the English colonies in North America
- Treaty of Hartford (1786), fixed border between New York and Massachusetts
