= Genesee County Courthouse Historic District =

Historic district in New York, United States

- U.S. National Register of Historic Places
- U.S. Historic district
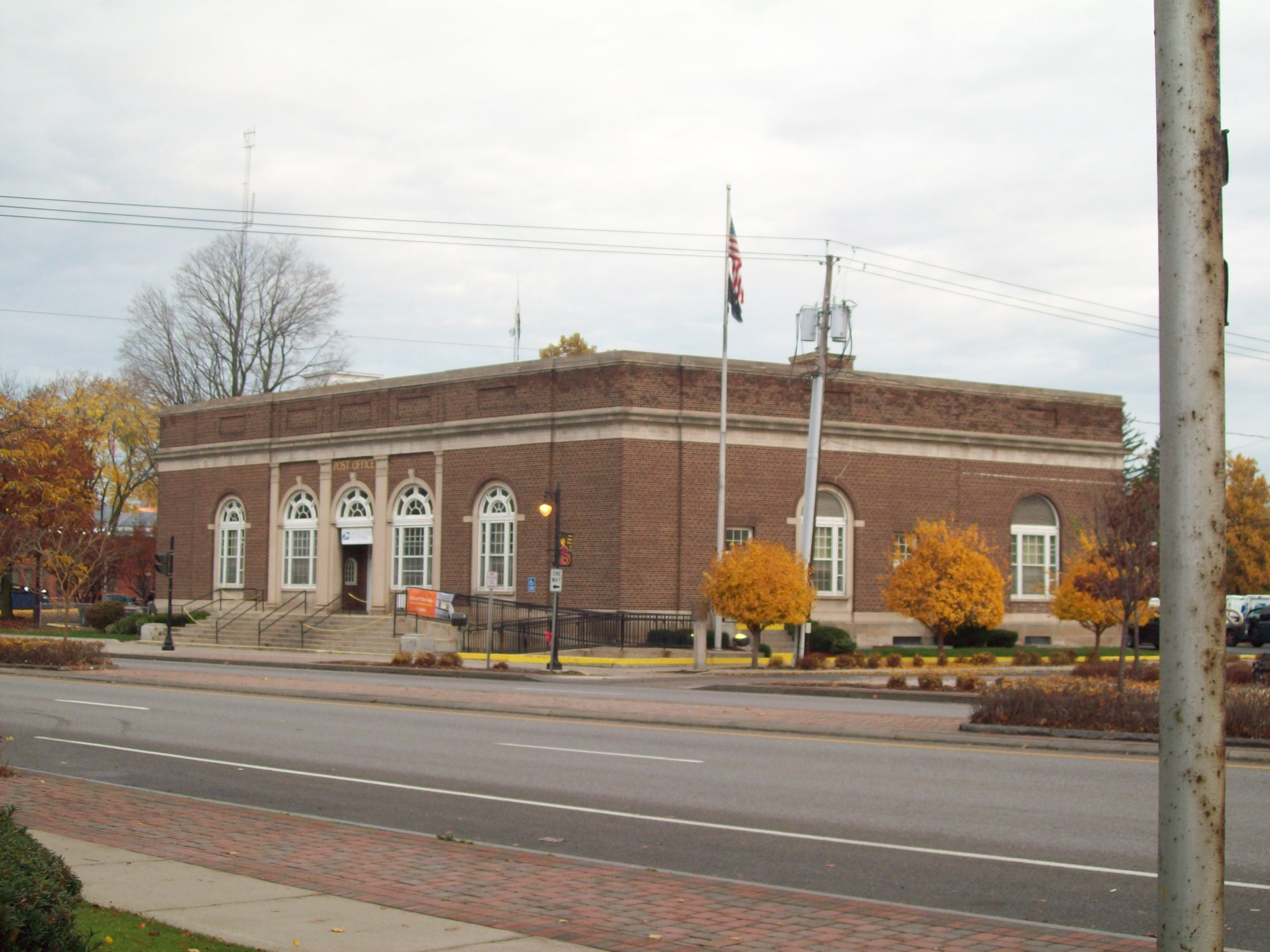
- South elevation and east profile of post office, 2009

- Location within New York Location within the United States
- Interactive map showing the location for Genesee County Courthouse District
- Location: Batavia, NY
- Coordinates: 42°59′53″N 78°11′14″W
- Area: 5 acres (2.0 ha)
- Built: 1841–1926
- Architect: Multiple
- Architectural style: Gothic, Italianate, Colonial Revival
- NRHP reference No.: 82001173
- Added to NRHP: December 10, 1982

The Genesee County Courthouse Historic District is located at the junction of Main, West Main and Ellicott streets (New York state routes 5, 33 and 63) in downtown Batavia, New York, United States. It is a small area with the county courthouse, a war memorial and other government buildings dating from the 1840s to the 1920s. Some were originally built for private purposes.

With the federal government represented as well as the city, it constitutes the civic core of Batavia, the city from whence the Holland Purchase, covering all of today's Western New York, was subdivided and settled in the early 19th century. In 1982 it was recognized as a historic district, one of two in the county, and listed on the National Register of Historic Places.

== Geography ==
The district is an irregularly shaped five-acre (2.0 ha) area on the north side of West Main and both sides of West Main, with its southern border at Ellicott. In the latter area, the triangular parcel between Main, Ellicott and Court Street, it includes the county courthouse and the county government building to its east. The Civil War memorial at the junction is also included. Across the street the buildings included, from west to east, are the original county jail, the post office, and city hall.

To the south are other, modern government buildings and Tonawanda Creek. The Holland Land Office building, a National Historic Landmark now used as a historical museum, is on the south side of West Main two blocks to the west, with commercial buildings on the north giving way to houses in the adjacent blocks to the north and west. East of the district is the commercial core of Batavia.

== Contributing properties ==
The district encompasses five government buildings and a monument. There are no non-contributing properties.

- Batavia City Hall, 10 West Main Street. George Brisbane, son of original settler James Brisbane, built this two-story brick Italianate-style mansion in 1853. After some alterations in 1876, the city acquired it from his descendants in 1917 and adapted it for its current use as city hall, without adversely affecting the original architecture.
- Genesee County Courthouse, Main and Ellicott Streets. Built between 1841 and 1843, it is the oldest building in the district, the focal point of traffic reaching the city center from the west. It uses local limestone for its load-bearing walls. Modeled on the timber frame courthouse built nearby by Joseph Ellicott in the early 19th century, the original Greek Revival style, made more prominent by the colonnade on the east (front) facade, has been softened by the expansion of the interior into the porch to create more office space. Still used as the offices of the county manager, county attorney and the meeting place of the county legislature, it was listed on the Register in 1973.
- Genesee County Building #1, Court Street. The most recent building in the district is located on the site of the original courthouse, which burned down in 1918. Eight years later, this two-and-a-half–story 13-bay Classical Revival brick building and decorative elements including a balustrade, quoins and pilasters was built at a cost of $150,000 ($2.73 million in contemporary dollars) to take its place as county offices. A 1955 addition made it T-shaped. Renovations at the end of the 20th century made it disabled-accessible.
- Genesee County Sheriff's Office and Jail, West Main Street. Poughkeepsie architect William J. Beardsley designed this two-story Victorian Gothic structure, completed in 1903. The turrets, brick and locally quarried Medina sandstone produce a small-scale fortress effect, similar to the nearby Attica Correctional Facility. It has remained in use by the sheriff's office since its construction, although other jail facilities have been built.
- Soldier's Monument, Main and Ellicott streets. A bronze eagle perches on a globe at the top of a 36-foot (11 m) shaft on a 14-foot–square (4.3 m) granite base surmounted by a globe above which a bronze eagle is perched with wings extended seven feet. Facing west is a statue of General Emory Upton. It was erected in 1919 to honor the area's Civil War veterans.
- U.S. Post Office, 2 West Main Street. This five-bay Classical Revival brick building on a sandstone foundation was built in 1919, credited to Treasury Department Supervising Architect James Wetmore. Its unusual parallelogram shape was required by the lot shape, in which the property lines run north-south instead of perpendicular to the street. It is one of only three post offices in New York that is a contributing property to a historic district while not itself being listed on the Register, for which it has been determined ineligible.

== History ==
Batavia was founded in 1802 by Joseph Ellicott, surveyor and agent for the Holland Land Company, the group of Dutch investors who had bought the 3 million acres (1.2 million ha) west of the Genesee River from Continental Army financier Robert Morris. Ellicott chose what became Batavia, the name what is today The Netherlands had at the time, since it was at the fork of two major Iroquois trails, today the highways that follow the three streets, across the region. From the beginning of settlement the future district was used for governmental purposes, with a courthouse built at the fork to file the deeds once the owners had paid off the mortgage, previously kept at the land office down the street.

Genesee County, which initially covered the entire Holland Purchase, was repeatedly subdivided into the 10 counties of the current region as it became settled and developed. With the 1840 creation of Wyoming County from the southern half of what had been the rump of Genesee County, Batavia resumed its central location within the county and erased any doubt as to its feasibility as the county seat. The current courthouse was built, a stone structure closely modeled on the original building. In its cupola is the original courthouse's bell, the only remnant of that building, which burned down in 1918 after a long period of use as village (later city) and town hall.

The opening of the Erie Canal, which bypassed Batavia in favor of Orleans County, led to a decline from the city's earlier importance. But growth returned when the railroads were built and came through, following the old roads. William Brisbane's 1853 mansion was built at the height of this prosperity, before the Midwest displaced Western New York as the United States' major wheat-growing area. Now city hall, Brisbane's mansion is the only building in the district not originally built for government use.

Early in the new century, the county built another new building in the future district to house its sheriff and prisoners. William J. Beardsley's late Victorian Gothic structure was opened in 1903. The years at the end of World War I saw a flurry of activity that did much to shape the district into the city's civic core. The city of Batavia bought Brisbane's mansion from his heirs and adapted it, with minimal significant change, into its city hall in 1917. The next year, the original courthouse that had stood since Ellicott's time was lost to fire. Across the street, the federal government established its presence in the area with a Classical Revival post office built on part of the original Brisbane property. The unusual shape of the parcel required that the building be shaped like a parallelogram.

In 1919, with the war over, the city and county built the Soldiers' Monument at the corner to the west of the courthouse, to memorialize not just its veterans from the recent war but those from the Civil War a half-century before as well. The statue of Emory Upton honors the memory of the most famous local soldier, whose innovative tactics led to a Union victory at the Battle of Spotsylvania Court House. It continues to honor and memorialize the veterans of later wars.

The last government building to be added to the district was the county government building. With county government growing in scope, more space was needed. The site of the original courthouse had remained vacant, and in the mid-1920s the Rochester firm of Bohacket and Brew was hired to build the current building. Their ornate brick Classical Revival structure was opened in 1927. Five years later, the county enclosed the courthouse porch to create more office space, turning its columns into pilasters.

Later renovations, in 1955, added a third wing to the county building. This is the most significant change to any of the buildings. The courthouse was modernized in the mid-1970s, and the county building made disabled-accessible in the late 20th century.

== See also ==
- National Register of Historic Places listings in Genesee County, New York
