= The Pulteney Association =

The Pulteney Association was a small group of British investors who in 1792 purchased a large portion of the Western New York land tract known as the Phelps and Gorham Purchase. The Pulteney Associates were Sir William Pulteney, 5th Baronet (1729–1805), a Scottish lawyer who owned nine-twelfths; William Hornby, former Governor of Bombay, who owned two-twelfths; and Patrick Colquhoun, a Scottish merchant with a one-twelfth share. Some of their heirs owned land in western New York into the 1920s, with the last parcel of The Pulteney Association property, 10 acres (40,000 m^{2}), being sold in December 1926.

== History ==
In 1788, following the United States victory in the American Revolutionary War, Oliver Phelps and Nathaniel Gorham purchased all of Massachusetts's preemptive right to land in Western New York, some 6,000,000 acres (24,000 km^{2}; 9,400 sq mi) (the "Phelps and Gorham Purchase"). The United States forced the previous occupants, nations of the Iroquois Confederacy, to cede the lands as they had been allies of Great Britain. After Massachusetts' claim was settled, New York state intended to sell the land for development and settlement.

Phelps and Gorham were to pay $1,000,000 in three equal annual installments for this land, payable in certain Massachusetts securities that were then valued at 20 cents on the dollar. Under the terms of the purchase agreement, they took title only when they had extinguished the Indian title. Later in 1788, they were able to extinguish Indian title to all lands east of the Genesee River between Lake Ontario and the Pennsylvania border, as well as a tract 12 miles (19 km) by 24 miles (39 km) paralleling the west bank of the Genesee River ("The Mill Yard Tract"), totalling some 2,250,000 acres (9,100 km^{2}; 3,520 sq mi).

In 1790, with the price of Massachusetts securities soaring, Phelps and Gorham became unable to pay the second installment on the purchase contract, and the preemptive right to lands west of the Genesee River reverted to Massachusetts. The state resold that right to Robert Morris, a signer of the Declaration of Independence, a financier of the American Revolution, and the wealthiest man in the United States. (See Holland Land Company, The Holland Purchase, and The Morris Reserve.) Phelps and Gorham received the deed to the lands east of the Genesee to which they had extinguished title, but they conveyed all of the remaining unsold land to Morris.

In 1792, Morris's London agent, William Temple Franklin, grandson of Benjamin Franklin, sold 12,000,000 acres (49,000 km^{2}; 19,000 sq mi) of the Phelps and Gorham Purchase east of the Genesee River to The Pulteney Associates. The Pulteney Purchase, or the Genesee Tract, as it was also known, comprised all of the present counties of Ontario, Steuben and Yates, as well as portions of Allegany, Livingston, Monroe, Schuyler and Wayne counties. After Sir William Pulteney's death in 1805, it was known as the Pulteney Estate.

The Pulteney Estate was managed by a series of agents, including:

- Cpt. Charles Williamson (1792–1801)
- Robert Troup (1801–1832)
  - Represented by John Johnstone, John Heslop and Robert Scott, successively as sub-agents, until 1814
- Joeseph Fellows (1832–1871)
- Edward A. Kingsland (1871–1894)
- Judge Mason and Mr. Rose (1894–1900), Mr. Rose thereafter
