= William Temple Franklin =

American diplomat (1760–1823)

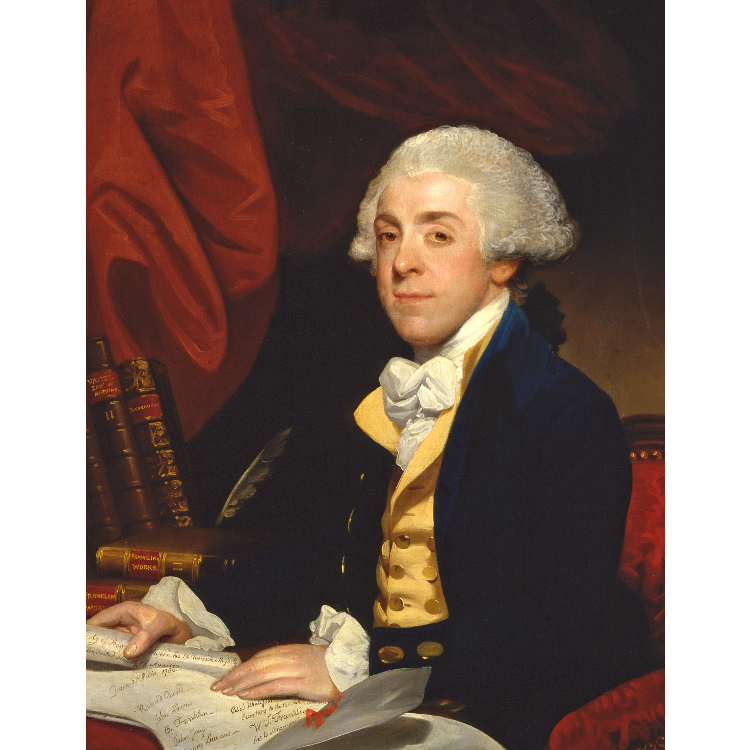
- William Temple Franklin, painted by Mather Brown in 1782

Personal details
- Born: February 22, 1760 London, England
- Died: May 25, 1823 (aged 63) Paris, France
- Resting place: Père Lachaise Cemetery
- Spouse: Hannah Collyer (m. 1823)
- Children: 5
- Parent(s): William Franklin; Mary Johnson D'Evelin (stepmother)
- Occupation: Diplomat, real estate speculator, editor

William Temple Franklin, known as Temple Franklin, (February 22, 1760 – May 25, 1823) was an American diplomat and real estate speculator who is best known for his involvement with the American diplomatic mission in France during the American Revolutionary War. Beginning at the age of 16, he served as secretary to his grandfather Benjamin Franklin, who negotiated and agreed to the Franco-American Alliance.

The younger Franklin was also secretary for the American delegation that negotiated United States independence at the Treaty of Paris in 1783. He returned to Philadelphia with his grandfather afterward. Finding his prospects limited in the United States, he later returned to Europe, where he lived mostly in France.

== Early life and education ==
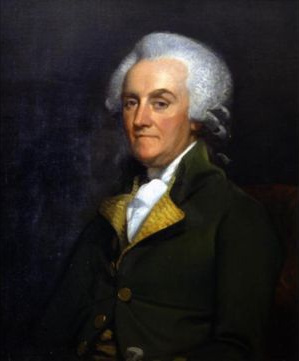
Temple's father William Franklin was Governor of New Jersey and a prominent Loyalist.

William Temple Franklin, called Temple, was born in 1760, the extramarital (and only) son of William Franklin, who fathered him while a law student in London. His mother is unknown, and the infant was placed in foster care. His father William was the extramarital but acknowledged son of Benjamin Franklin, one of the Founding Fathers of the United States, and raised in his household. While there is some speculation that William Temple Franklin's middle name was derived from the fact that he was conceived while his father was studying at the Middle Temple, that seems highly unlikely and uncharacteristically idiosyncratic. Temple was, in fact, born more than a year after his father completed his legal studies and was called to the bar. The more likely answer, in keeping with both 18th-century naming conventions and the political and social connections of both William and Benjamin Franklin, is that Temple was named for Richard Grenville-Temple, 2nd Earl Temple, an ally of the Franklins and a senior member of the British governing ministry when Temple was born.

Later in 1762, William married Elizabeth Downes in London, the daughter of a wealthy Barbados planter. After passing the bar, he returned to North America, but he continued to pay for the upkeep and later education of Temple.

In 1763, with the aid of his father, Benjamin Franklin, William Franklin was appointed as the last colonial governor of New Jersey and went to North America. He left Temple in foster care. William's position as a Loyalist later put him at odds with his father, and they broke permanently over it. William Franklin was imprisoned during the Revolution and was forced into exile in Britain.

Benjamin Franklin learned of his grandson Temple (his only grandson through the male line) on an extended mission in London, when the boy was about four. He became fond of the young boy but at first did not tell him of his full identity. He eventually took over custody, returned with the youth to the United Colonies in 1775, and acknowledged their blood relation. Now a widower, Franklin raised the boy in his household.

== Paris ==
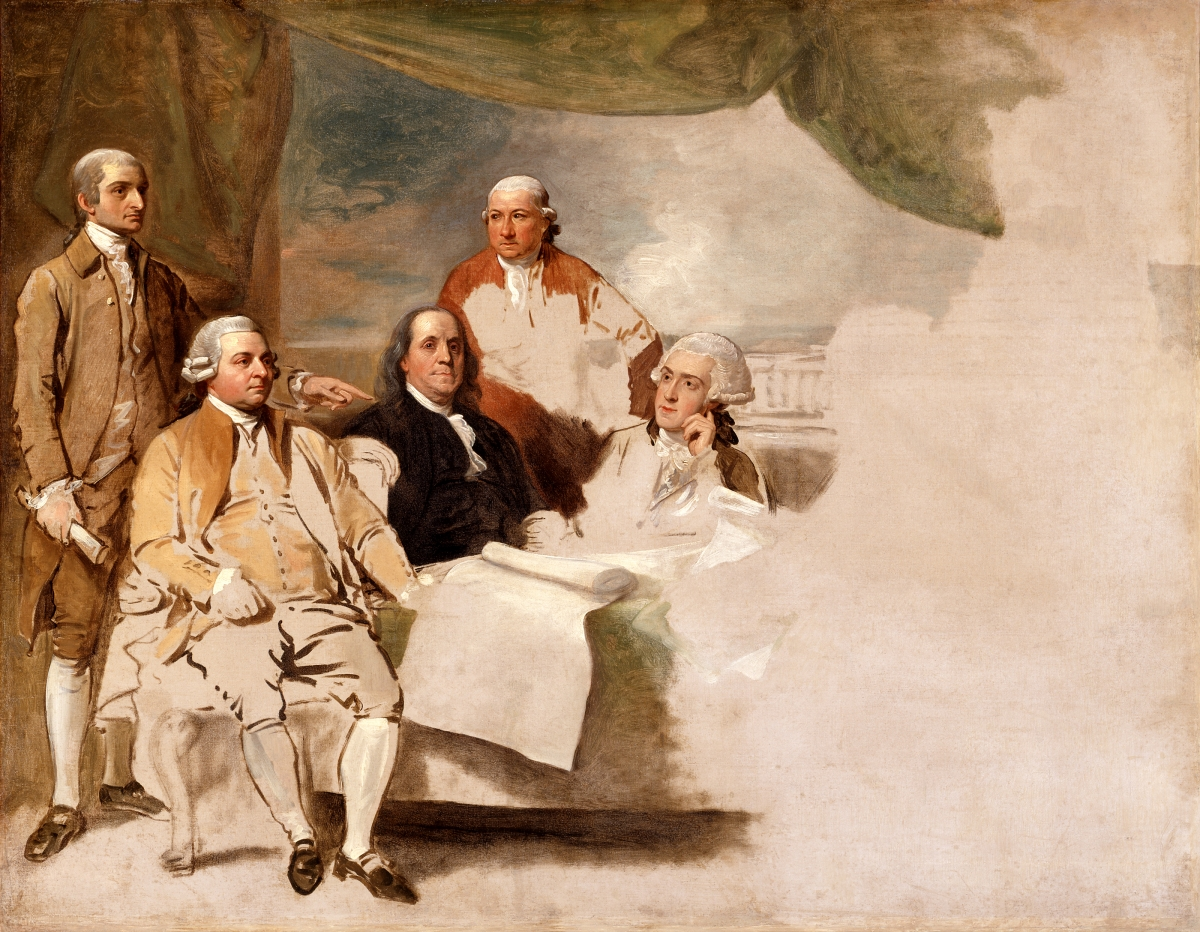
Treaty of Paris, by Benjamin West (1783), shows the American commissioners who signed the 1783 Treaty of Paris. From left to right are John Jay, John Adams, Benjamin Franklin, Henry Laurens, and William Temple Franklin. The British commissioners did not pose for West, and the picture was never finished.

Temple, as he was generally known, accompanied his grandfather Benjamin Franklin to France in late 1776. From the age of 16, he worked as secretary to the American diplomatic mission during the American Revolution. Benjamin hoped the trip would round out Temple's education. Along with his cousin Benjamin Franklin Bache, Temple was educated further in France and Switzerland.

A bon vivant, Temple received his highest public appointment as Secretary to the American delegation at the Treaty of Paris in 1782 to 1783 largely through the influence of his grandfather. He never again attained a significant political post in the United States. Benjamin Franklin unsuccessfully lobbied Congress in the hope that Temple would be given a diplomatic post and believed that in time, his grandson would succeed him as Ambassador to France. His appeal was rejected for a variety of reasons, including political opposition to Benjamin Franklin and suspicions about Temple's relations with his Loyalist father, who had gone into exile in London. Thomas Jefferson commiserated with Temple over his failure to secure a post but wrote a letter to James Monroe that raised questions about the young man's temperament and abilities.

During the negotiations for the Treaty of Paris, Temple asked one of the British peace commissioners if something could be done for his father. He noted his father's steadfast defense of the Stamp Act and hoped that the British government might award him a diplomatic post. During 1784, Temple went to London and reconciled with his father, lengthened his stay several times, and returned to Paris at the end of the year. In January 1785, Temple received the first airmail in history when a letter from his father was brought across the English Channel by a hydrogen balloon, flown by Jean-Pierre Blanchard and John Jeffries.

== Later life ==
When Benjamin Franklin relinquished his post and sailed home to the United States in 1785, Temple accompanied him. Temple was elected to the American Philosophical Society in 1786. Franklin sent the younger man to see government officials in Philadelphia, to try to recover expenses owed for his time in Paris, but his request was not granted. With his hopes of a diplomatic career at an end, Benjamin Franklin advised Temple to try to develop as a major landowner since many areas of the country were being settled in the rapid postwar development. By that stage, Temple was disillusioned. He said that the United States was driven by factions and that if a foreign power were to attempt to conquer the country, it would certainly be successful.

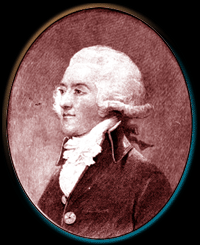
Franklin painted by John Trumbull (1790–91)

After the elder Franklin died in 1790, Temple lived for a while with his father William in England. In London, he acted as an agent of the American Robert Morris of Philadelphia, a signer of the Declaration of Independence, a financier of the American Revolution, and the wealthiest man in the United States. (See Holland Land Company, The Holland Purchase, and The Morris Reserve.) In 1792, Franklin sold 12,000,000 acres (49,000 km^{2}; 19,000 sq mi) of the Phelps and Gorham Purchase east of the Genesee River in New York state to The Pulteney Association, made up of three British investors. There was widespread land speculation in New York after the Revolution, as most of the Iroquois nations, as allies of the British, had been forced to cede their lands to the United States by the postwar treaty. Millions of acres became available for sale to investors, speculators, and settlers.

The town and village of Franklinville, in Cattaraugus County (one of the counties formed from land in the Holland Purchase), is named after William Temple Franklin.

== Children ==
During his first period in France, Temple had an illegitimate son, Théodore, with his mistress, Blanchette Caillot, a married woman. Théodore died before his fifth birthday from smallpox. After his return to England and living with his father, Temple Franklin had an illegitimate daughter, Ellen (May 15, 1798 London – 1875 Nice, France), with Ellen Johnson D’Evelin, the sister-in-law of his father’s second wife, Mary (who had been a widow with children). William Franklin took responsibility for his granddaughter Ellen. Temple moved to Paris, where he lived the remainder of his life and never saw his father again. Temple’s daughter, Ellen, eventually married Capel Hanbury and had a daughter named Maria Hanbury, who was unmarried and had no children.

== Years in France ==
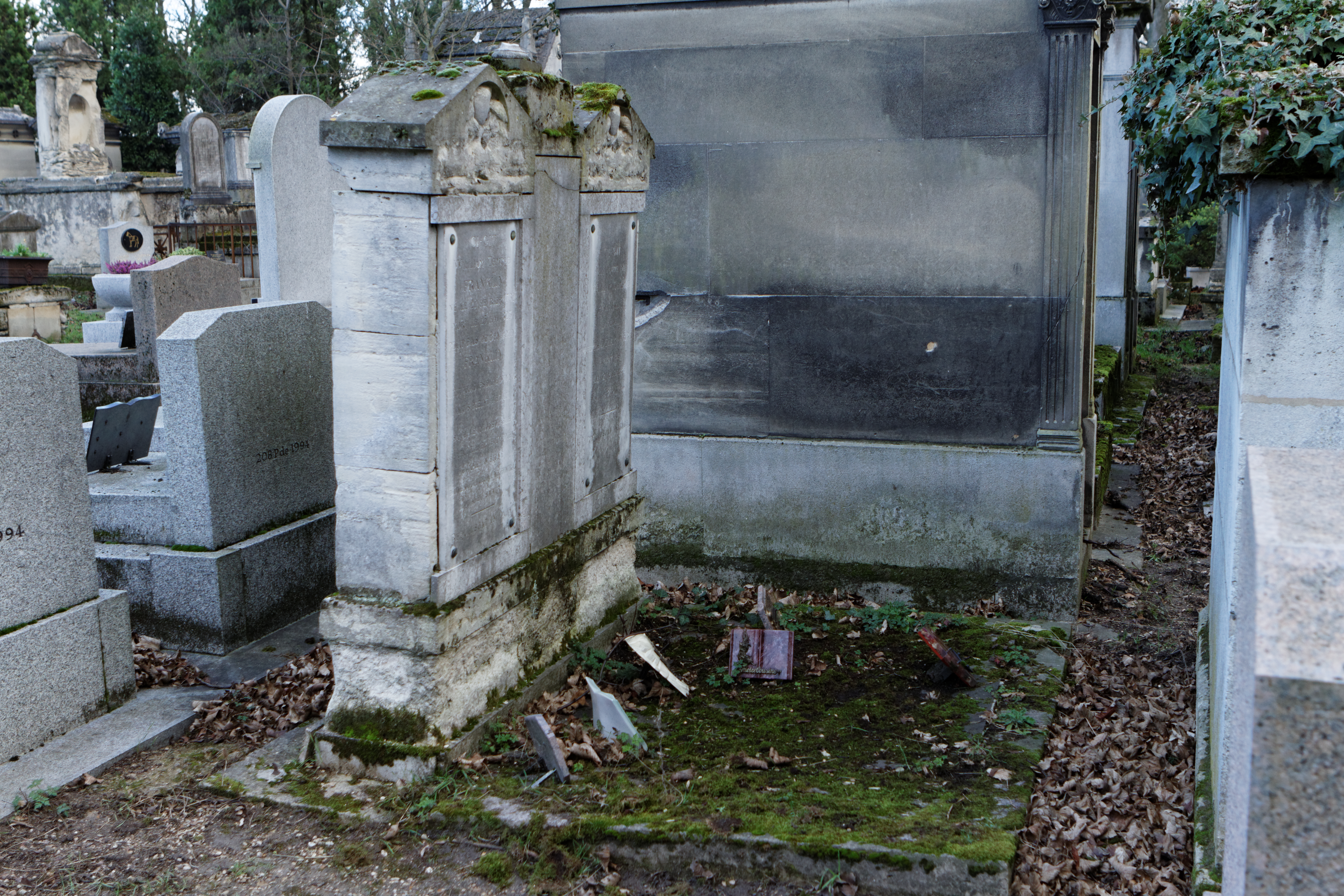
Père Lachaise Cemetery

After his move to France, Franklin continued to act as a real estate speculator, gaining and losing a fortune.

By his will of 1788, Benjamin Franklin had bequeathed Temple his papers and correspondence and appointed him as his literary heir. Temple edited and published editions of Franklin's writings, including his Autobiography, published in London and Philadelphia, 1816–1819. He published six volumes of papers from 1817 to 1819. His close friend, George Fox, inherited many of the senior Franklin's papers and later donated them to the American Philosophical Society. Temple Franklin's collected papers are held by the American Philosophical Society in Philadelphia.

While he was living in France during this period, Temple had a long relationship with Englishwoman Hannah Collyer (1771–1846). They married a month before his 1823 death in Paris. Temple is buried at Père Lachaise Cemetery. Hannah died on December 12, 1846, at age 75, and is buried next to Temple.

== In popular culture ==
Noah Jupe portrays William Temple Franklin as a teenager in the 2024 Apple TV+ miniseries Franklin.

== Works ==
- Edited The Autobiography of Benjamin Franklin (London and Philadelphia, 1816–1819)
- The Private Correspondence of Benjamin Franklin (1817). A series of letters on miscellaneous, literary, and political subjects, written between the years 1753 and 1790. Comprised and first published from the originals by his grandson William Temple Franklin.
- Edited three-volume Memoirs of the Life and Writings of Benjamin Franklin, published 1819

== See also ==
- The Papers of Benjamin Franklin
- The Pulteney Association

== Bibliography ==
- Schaeper, Thomas J. France and America in the Revolutionary Era: The Life of Jacques-Donatien Leray de Chaumont, 1725–1803. Berghahn Books, 1995.
- Schiff, Stacy. Benjamin Franklin and the Birth of America. Bloomsbury, 2006.
