= Pierre Raffeix =

French Jesuit missionary in Canada

- Born: 1633; Clermont-Ferrand, France
- Died: 1724 (aged 90–91); Québec, Canada
- Occupations: Missionary, cartographer

Pierre Raffeix (1633–1724) was a French Jesuit missionary in Canada.

== Biography ==
He was born at Clermont-Ferrand, entered the Society of Jesus in 1653, and came to Canada in 1663. In 1668 he established near Montreal a settlement for converted Haudenosaunee (now Kahnawake).

In 1671 he replaced Étienne de Carheil in the Cayuga mission, and afterwards went to the Seneca Indians until 1680.

Raffeix was a cartographer, as the following surviving maps bear witness:

- "Carte des regions les plus occidentales du Canada", dated 1676, and bearing a legend relating to the voyage of discovery of Jacques Marquette and Louis Joliet;
- "Le lac Ontario avec les pays adjacents et surtout les cinq nations iroquoises";
- "La Nouvelle-France, de l'Océan au lac Erié, et, au sud, jusqu'à la Nouvelle-Angleterre".

After his return to Quebec he acted as procurator to the mission. He spent two years at Jeune-Lorette (1699–1700), shortly after the final migration of the remnants of the Wendat (Huron) nation. He died at Quebec.
