= Treaty of Paris (painting) =

1783 painting by Benjamin West

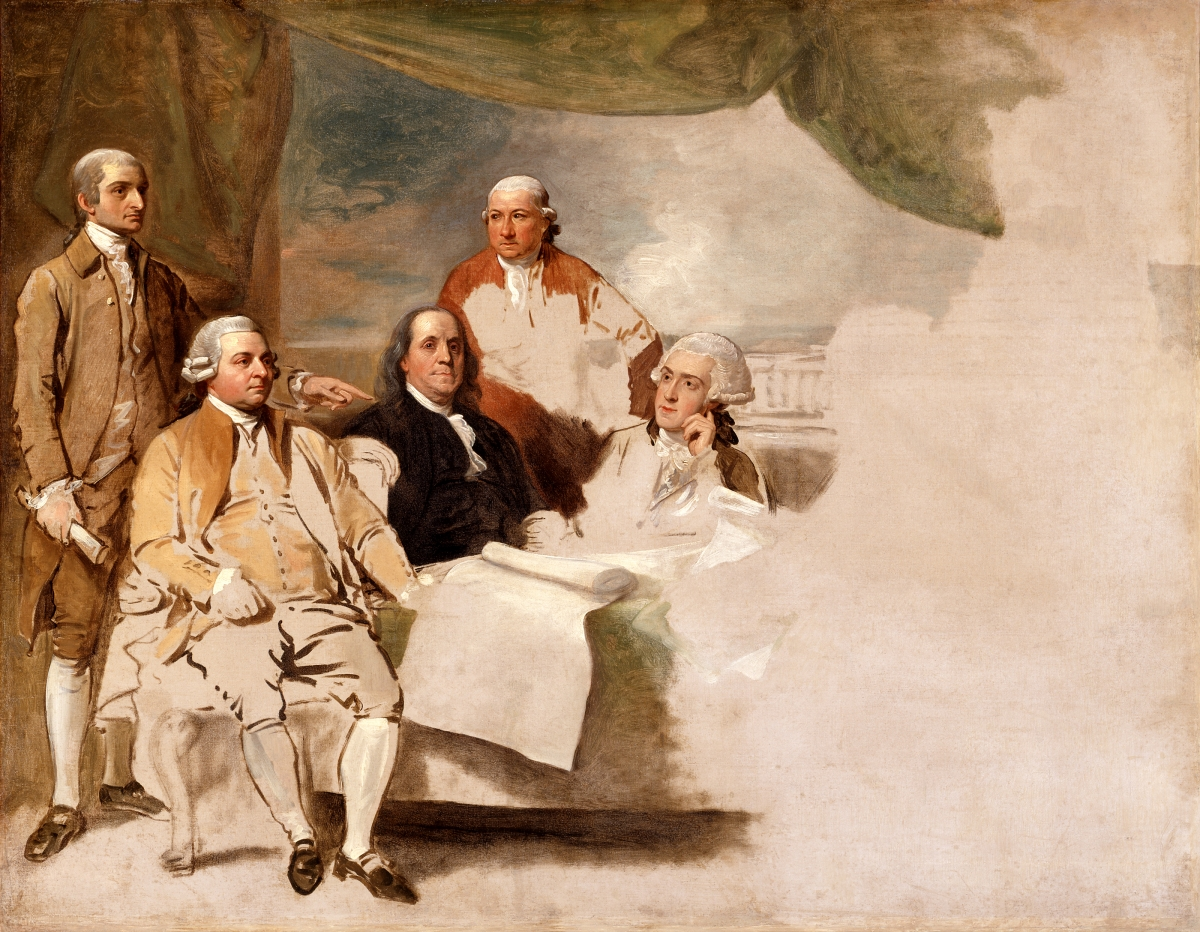
- Treaty of Paris, by Benjamin West, 1783 (left to right: John Jay, John Adams, Benjamin Franklin, Henry Laurens, and William Temple Franklin)
- Artist: Benjamin West
- Year: 1783
- Medium: Oil on canvas
- Movement: History painting
- Dimensions: 72.4 cm × 92.1 cm (28.5 in × 36.3 in)
- Location: Winterthur Museum, Garden and Library, Winterthur, Delaware, US

American Commissioners of the Preliminary Peace Agreement with Great Britain, also known as the Treaty of Paris, is an unfinished 1783 painting by Benjamin West depicting the United States delegation that negotiated the 1783 Treaty of Paris, which formally ended the American Revolutionary War. Peace negotiations began in Paris on June 25, 1783, and the eventual signing of the treaty took place on September 3, 1783 at the Hotel York at 56 rue Jacob. The green drapery in the painting's background and the distant landscape with a classical colonnaded building emphasize the scene's formality.

John Jay, John Adams, Benjamin Franklin, Henry Laurens, and William Temple Franklin (presented from left to right) are depicted early during the negotiation process (Laurens and the younger Franklin were not present at the treaty's signing). Benjamin Franklin was the only U.S. delegate who did not pose in person; West drew his likeness from an engraving.

Meant to be depicted on the right, the British delegation comprising representative Richard Oswald and his secretary, Caleb Whitefoord, declined to pose. The conspicuous absence of the British commissioners evokes the "tentative nature of the peace" and the "deep geopolitical antagonisms" that persisted after the Revolution. West never completed his painting. According to John Quincy Adams, West intended to present the painting as a gift to Congress.

The painting, a gift of Henry Francis du Pont, is in the permanent collection of the Winterthur Museum, Garden and Library, du Pont's former home in Winterthur, Delaware. Du Pont had purchased the work from the J. P. Morgan collection in 1948. The painting was displayed at the Metropolitan Museum of Art in 2016 as part of an exhibition on unfinished paintings.

In 1983, to celebrate the bicentennial of the Treaty of Paris, the United States Postal Service issued a commemorative stamp inspired by the painting. However, many details were changed: Laurens and William Franklin are removed, Jay now hunches over the table to Franklin's left, and the right side of the painting—unfinished in West's original—is filled in with the back of British signatory David Hartley. Historian Stanley Weintraub called the stamp "a travesty of history and a mischievous misuse of West's canvas."
