= Oliver Phelps (politician) =

American politician (1749–1809)

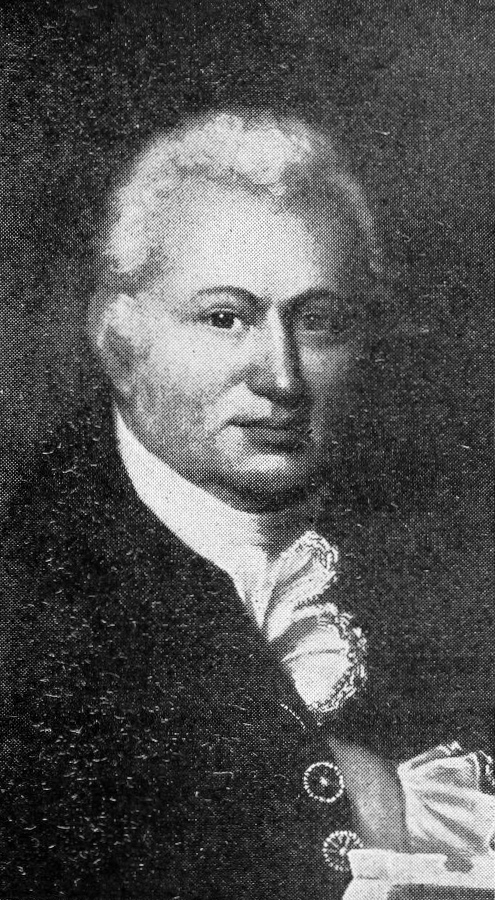

Member of the U.S. House of Representatives from New York's 17th district
- In office March 4, 1803 – March 3, 1805
- Preceded by: None; new seat
- Succeeded by: Silas Halsey

Personal details
- Born: October 21, 1749 Poquonock, Connecticut Colony, British America
- Died: February 21, 1809 (aged 59) Canandaigua, New York, U.S.
- Resting place: Pioneer Cemetery, Canandaigua, New York
- Party: Democratic-Republican
- Spouse: Mary Seymour
- Children: Oliver Leicester, Mary
- Occupation: Merchant, commissary, land speculator
- Profession: Judge, politician

Oliver Phelps (October 21, 1749 – February 21, 1809) was an American politician. He was early in life a tavern keeper in Granville, Massachusetts. During the Revolution he was Deputy Commissary of the Continental Army and served until the end of the war. After the war ended, he was appointed a judge, was elected to the U.S. House of Representatives, and became a land speculator in western New York state. A depressed real estate market forced him to sell most of his holdings.

== Personal life ==
Phelps was born in Poquonock in the Connecticut Colony. His father, Thomas Phelps, died in Oliver's first year of life, and his mother was left to raise their seventeen children. Phelps took a job at age seven in a local store to help support his family.

When he was 21 in 1770, Oliver and his young wife Mary moved to Suffield, where he apprenticed to a local merchant, and in 1770 the couple moved to Granville, where he opened his own store.

== Career ==
At the beginning of the Revolutionary War, Phelps joined the Continental Army and fought in the Battle of Lexington. He left the service in 1777 and, relying on his experience as a merchant, became Massachusetts Superintendent of Purchases of Army Supplies, a Deputy Commissary of the Continental Army. He was introduced to Robert Morris, the great financier of Revolutionary times. He supplied troops and received commendation from General George Washington for his efforts. He was a member of the Massachusetts House of Representatives from 1778 to 1780 and a member of the Federal Constitutional Convention in 1779 and 1780. After the war ended, he became a prominent businessman and was elected to the Massachusetts Senate in 1785 and served on the Governor's council in 1786. He was elected as a Democratic-Republican to the Eighth United States Congress, holding office from March 4, 1803, to March 3, 1805, and ran unsuccessfully for Lieutenant Governor of New York in 1804 on the ticket headed by Aaron Burr.

=== Land speculation ===
The connections he established during the Revolutionary War aided his efforts in forming in 1788 a syndicate with Nathaniel Gorham, also a former member of the Federal Constitutional Convention. They organized a company of speculators, retaining 82 shares for themselves, and brought in competing companies to join in their effort. They sold 15 shares to the Niagara Company, composed of Colonel John Butler, Samuel Street, and other Tory friends of the Indians, and another 23 shares were divided among 21 persons. Following the American Revolution, there remained a confusing collection of contradictory royal charters from James I, Charles I, and Charles II, mixed with a succession of treaties with the Dutch and with the Indians, which made the legal situation intractable. Massachusetts owned land west of the "Preemption Line" in New York that was disconnected geographically from the rest of the state. New York and Massachusetts reached a compromise settling their competing claims for the region in December 1786 with the signing of the Treaty of Hartford. The syndicate lobbied for a law that was passed by the Massachusetts legislature that enabled them to buy land, payable over three years, using Massachusetts Consolidated Scrip, which was worth about 20 cents on a dollar at the time.

On July 4–8, 1788 a council was held with chiefs of the Five Nations of Indian at Buffalo Creek. Phelps was the active agent for the syndicate and negotiated with the Indians to purchase their title to the land. The Indians considered themselves to be the owners of the land, but Phelps persuaded the Chiefs that since they had been allies to the defeated British during the Revolutionary War, and since the British had given up the lands in the 1783 peace treaty, the tribes could only expect to retain whatever lands the United States would allow them to keep. Phelps and Gorham wanted to buy 2,600,000-acre (11,000 km^{2}), but the Indians refused to sell the rights to any land west of the Genesee River. Phelps suggested that the Indians could take advantage of a grist mill to grind their maize which would relieve the women of the grinding work. The Indians asked how much land was needed for a grist mill, and Phelps suggested a section of land 20 miles (32 km) wide and 12 miles (19 km) deep, about 288 square miles (750 km^{2}), along the western bank of the river. Phelps and Gorham finally bought the rights to 494,000-acre (2,000 km^{2}) including a tract on the west bank of the river later named Mill Yard Tract where they planned to locate a saw mill and grist mill. The Indians were later much amazed that so large a tract of land was needed for the grist mill.

They paid US$1 million (about £300,000), or less than 25 cents per acre, between 1787 and 1788.

At first Phelps and Gorham thought they would make the site of current-day Geneva their headquarters, but discovered that their survey had somehow left that site just east of their boundary. So they chose Canandaigua, New York, at the head of Canandaigua Lake, as the seat of the new Ontario County. The name Canandaigua is derived from the Iroquois word "Kanandarque" which means chosen spot. It was the site of the principal village of the Seneca Indians, burned by the whites during the war in the Sullivan Expedition.

=== Builds home in Suffield ===
After the purchase, Phelps returned to Suffield, Connecticut, and bought what was later named the Hatheway House from its builder Shem Burbank, who as a Tory sympathizer during the American Revolution had suffered financial difficulties afterward. Phelps spent generously on furnishings for the home, hired servants, and added a wing to the home in 1794, a display of his wealth and an "architectural masterpiece" that still features original Paris-made wallpaper.

He opened one of the first land sales offices in the U.S. in Suffield and another in Canandaigua. During the next two years he and his partners sold 500,000-acre (2,000 km^{2}) at a higher price to a number of buyers. But land sales failed to raise enough capital to meet their payment requirements, and in August 1790 they sold 1,276,569-acre (5,166.09 km^{2}) to U.S. Senator Robert Morris of Pennsylvania, who Phelps had done business with during the Revolutionary War. Morris paid eight pence half penny or between 11 and 12 cents per acre, about half of what Phelps and Gorham had paid. They retained only two townships totaling 47,000-acre (190 km^{2}) for themselves. Morris almost immediately sold the land to an English syndicate for £75,000 (about $333,000), netting a good profit.

Phelps was appointed the first judge of Ontario County (1789–1793), even before he moved to Canandaigua in 1792. He built the first framed house in Canandaigua and a grist mill. Phelps retained extensive holdings in the infant Ontario County. He maintained an interest in its affairs and in further land speculations. He was a founder and the largest stock holder in the Hartford National Bank and Trust Co. He was also the largest financial contributor to the Hamilton-Oneida Academy built in 1793 by Samuel Kirkland on 300-acre (1.2 km^{2}) acres he donated. Kirkland, a Presbyterian minister and missionary among the Oneida, had aided Phelps in his land purchase from the Indians and had received 4,000-acre (16 km^{2}) acres from the Oneidas and New York State. He was also appointed the first judge of Ontario County and served in Congress between 1803 and 1805.

=== Loses land holdings and home ===
Later in 1789, the value of the Massachusetts scrip had risen to par value and substantially inflated the cost to purchase the remaining 1,000,000-acre (4,000 km^{2}) which they had not yet obtained title to from the Indians. They gave up their contract for the land instead. Despite his remaining, vast land holdings, changing money values affected the mortgages held on the tracts of land and a depressed land market caused Phelps to get into financial difficulty. In August 1790, the reverses forced him to sell his Suffield home and his interest in the Hartford National Bank and Trust Co.

He continued to invest in land and by 1796 had purchased roughly a million acres of land along the Mississippi River. He also helped organize the Connecticut Land Company which for $1,200,000 bought all but the extreme western portion of the Connecticut Western Reserve in the Northwest Territory from the state of Connecticut. Phelps borrowed heavily to finance the company. In 1796, his creditors demanded payment. Facing the possibility of debtors' prison, Phelps went into seclusion. In 1802 he moved to Canandaigua, New York, and he served in the U.S. House of Representatives from 1803 to 1805.

== Family ==
He married Mary Seymour, daughter of Zachariah Seymour and Sarah (née Steele) Seymour. Together, they were the parents of a son and a daughter:

- Oliver Leicester Phelps (1775–1813), who married Elizabeth "Betsy" Law Sherman, a daughter of William Sherman and granddaughter of founding father Roger Sherman.
- Mary Phelps (1778–1859), who married Amasa Jackson, the first president of the Union Bank of New York; he was a son of General Michael Jackson, who commanded a regiment of minutemen in the Battle of Lexington.

Purchasers of his land had continued difficulty paying off the mortgage loans which he held. He tried to help those who had bought his land contracts but who could not fulfill their contracts, and Phelps died on February 21, 1809, in the town he sold and helped develop. He was interred in the Pioneer Cemetery in Canandaigua, New York.

=== Descendants ===
Through his daughter Mary, he was a grandfather of Harriet Jackson (1804–1868), who married John Albert Granger, son of U.S. Postmaster General Gideon Granger and younger brother to U.S. Representative Francis Granger.

U.S. House of Representatives
Preceded by new district	Member of the U.S. House of Representatives from New York's 17th congressional district 1803–1805	Succeeded by Silas Halsey
