= Nathaniel Gorham =

American Founding Father, businessman, and politician (1738–1796)

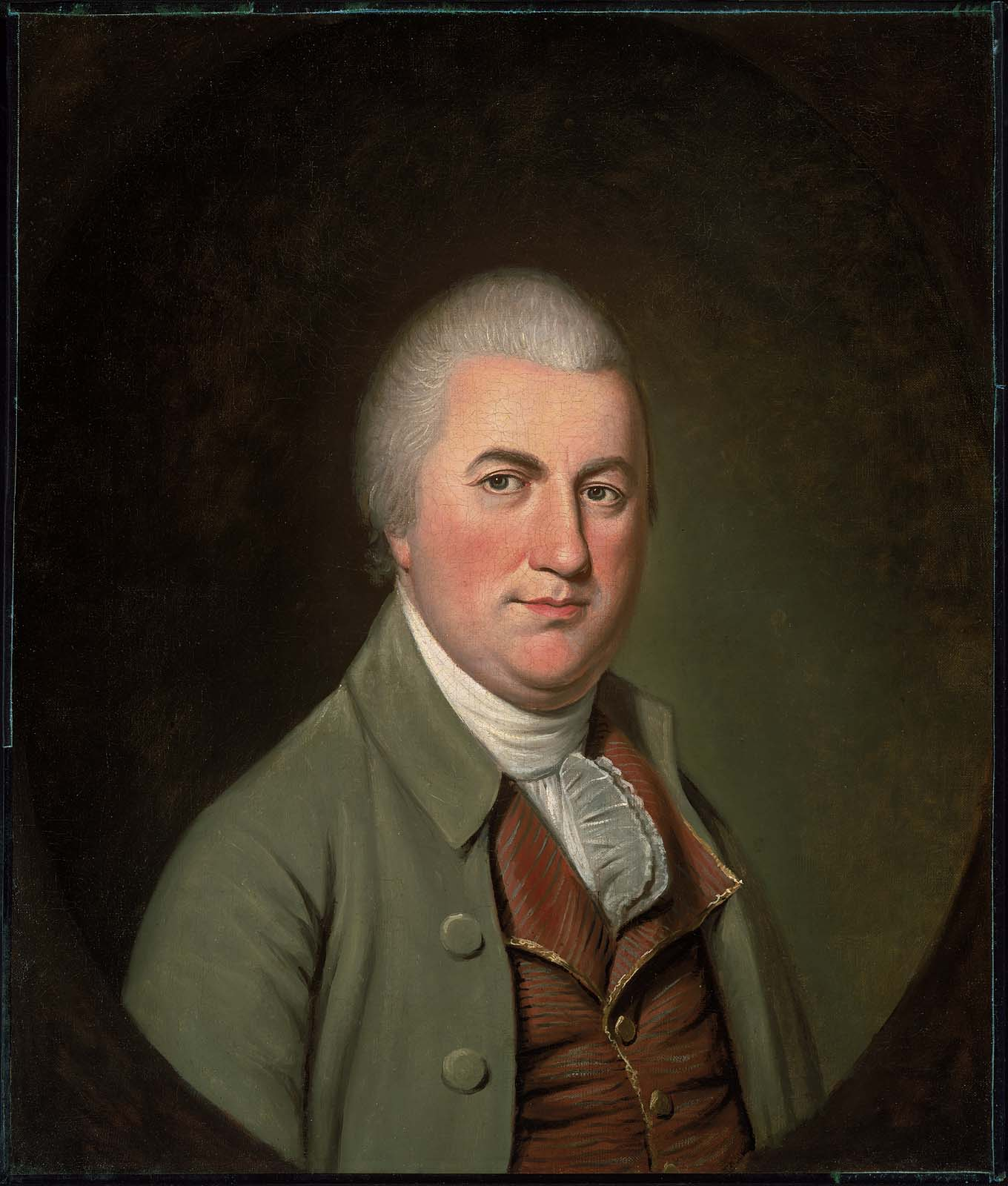
- Nathaniel Gorham by Charles Willson Peale, circa 1793

8th President of the Confederation Congress
- In office June 6, 1786 – February 2, 1787
- Preceded by: John Hancock
- Succeeded by: Arthur St. Clair

Personal details
- Born: May 27, 1738 Charlestown, Province of Massachusetts Bay, British America
- Died: June 11, 1796 (aged 58) Charlestown, Massachusetts, U.S.
- Resting place: Phipps Street Burying Ground; Charlestown
- Party: Federalist
- Spouse: Rebecca Call
- Children: Collinsworth Gorham; Emily Gorham; Mary Gorham; Elizabeth Gorham; Ann Gorham; John Gorham; Benjamin Gorham; Stephen Gorham; Lydia Gorham
- Profession: Politician, merchant

Nathaniel Gorham (May 27, 1738 – June 11, 1796; sometimes spelled Nathanial) was an American Founding Father, merchant, and politician from Massachusetts. He was a delegate from the Bay Colony to the Continental Congress and for six months served as the presiding officer of that body under the Articles of Confederation. He also attended the Constitutional Convention, served on its Committee of Detail, and signed the United States Constitution.

== Life ==
Starting at age 15, Gorham served an apprenticeship with a merchant in New London, Connecticut, after which he opened a merchant house in Charlestown, Massachusetts, in 1759. He took part in public affairs at the beginning of the American Revolution: he was a member of the Massachusetts General Court (legislature) from 1771 until 1775, a delegate to the Provincial congress from 1774 until 1775, and a member of the Board of War from 1778 until its dissolution in 1781. In 1779, he served in the state constitutional convention. He was a delegate to the Congress of the Confederation from 1782 until 1783, and also from 1785 until 1787, serving as its president for five months from June 6 to November 5, 1786, after the resignation of John Hancock. Gorham also served a term as judge of the Middlesex County Court of Common Pleas, was a candidate for the 3rd congressional district in both 1788 and 1790, in the former election winning on the first ballot but losing on the second, and was the runner-up in the 1790 election for the U.S. Senate.

Gorham married Rebecca Call (May 14, 1744 – November 18, 1812), who was descended from Anglican vicar and the first minister of Dorchester, Massachusetts, John Maverick, and his royally descended wife, Mary Gye Maverick. Rebecca was the daughter of Caleb Call and Rebecca Stimson. They were the parents of nine children.

In 1786, it might have been Gorham who suggested to Alexander Hamilton that Prince Henry of Prussia would become president or king of the United States. However, the offer was revoked before the prince could make a reply.

For several months in 1787, Gorham served as one of the Massachusetts delegates to the United States Constitutional Convention. Gorham frequently served as chairman of the convention's Committee of the whole, meaning that he (rather than the president of the convention, George Washington) presided over convention sessions during the delegates' first deliberations on the structure of the new government in late May and June 1787. After the convention, he worked hard to see that the Constitution was approved in his home state.

In connection with Oliver Phelps, he purchased from the state of Massachusetts in 1788 pre-emption rights to an immense tract of land in western New York State which straddled the Genesee River, all for the sum of $1,000,000 (about $19 million today). The land in question had been previously ceded to Massachusetts from the state of New York under the 1786 Treaty of Hartford. The pre-emption right gave them the first or preemptive right to obtain clear title to this land from the Native Americans. They soon extinguished the Native American title to the portion of the land east of the Genesee River, as well as a 185,000 acres (750 km^{2}) tract west of the Genesee, the Mill Yard Tract, surveyed all of it, laid out townships, and sold large parts to speculators and settlers. His son Nathaniel Gorham Jr. was a pioneer settler of this tract, having been placed in charge of his father's interests there. In 1790, after Gorham and Phelps defaulted in payment, they sold nearly all of their remaining lands east of the Genesee to Robert Morris, who eventually resold those lands to The Pulteney Association. Phelps and Gorham were unable to fulfill their contract in full to Massachusetts, so in 1790, they surrendered back to Massachusetts that portion of the lands which remained under the Native American title, namely, the land west of the Genesee. It also was eventually acquired by Robert Morris, who resold most of it to the Holland Land Company.

== Death and legacy ==
Gorham died in Charlestown in 1796. He is buried in the Phipps Street Cemetery in Charlestown. Gorham Street in Madison, Wisconsin, is named in his honor. The town of Gorham, New York, is also named in his honor.

== Descendants ==
Gorham's descendants number in the thousands today. Some of his notable descendants include:

- Gorham's son Benjamin Gorham was a U.S. Representative from Massachusetts.
- Bishop Phillips Brooks was an American clergyman and author, who briefly served as Bishop of Massachusetts in the Episcopal Church during the early 1890s. He is best known for authoring the Christmas carol "O Little Town of Bethlehem".
- Charles Francis Adams Jr. was a member of the prominent Adams family and son of Charles Francis Adams Sr. He served as a colonel in the Union Army during the American Civil War and was a railroad executive following the war.
- John Quincy Adams II was an American lawyer and politician, the son of Charles Francis Adams Sr. and the grandson and namesake of president John Quincy Adams.
- Charles Francis Adams III was the United States Secretary of the Navy under President Herbert Hoover.
- Charles Francis Adams IV was a U.S. electronics industrialist. He served as the first president of the Raytheon Company.
- Brooks Adams was an American historian and a critic of capitalism.
- Henry Adams was an American journalist, historian, academic and novelist. He is best known for his autobiographical book, The Education of Henry Adams.
- William Everett was a member of the U.S. House of Representatives from Massachusetts.
- Octavius Brooks Frothingham was an American clergyman and author.
- Catherine Lovering Adams married Henry Stugis Morgan, who was an American banker. He was the son of John Pierpont ("Jack") Morgan Jr. and the grandson of renowned banker John Pierpont Morgan Sr., founder of J.P. Morgan & Co.
- Peter Bulkeley Greenough was an American journalist and editor. He was the husband of opera singer Beverly Sills.
- Gorham Parks was a U.S. Representative from Maine.

== Notes ==
Political offices
Preceded by John Hancock	President of the Continental Congress; June 6, 1786 – November 5, 1786	Succeeded by Arthur St. Clair
