= Holland Land Office =

Historic building and museum in Batavia, New York

- U.S. National Register of Historic Places
- U.S. National Historic Landmark
- New York State Register of Historic Places
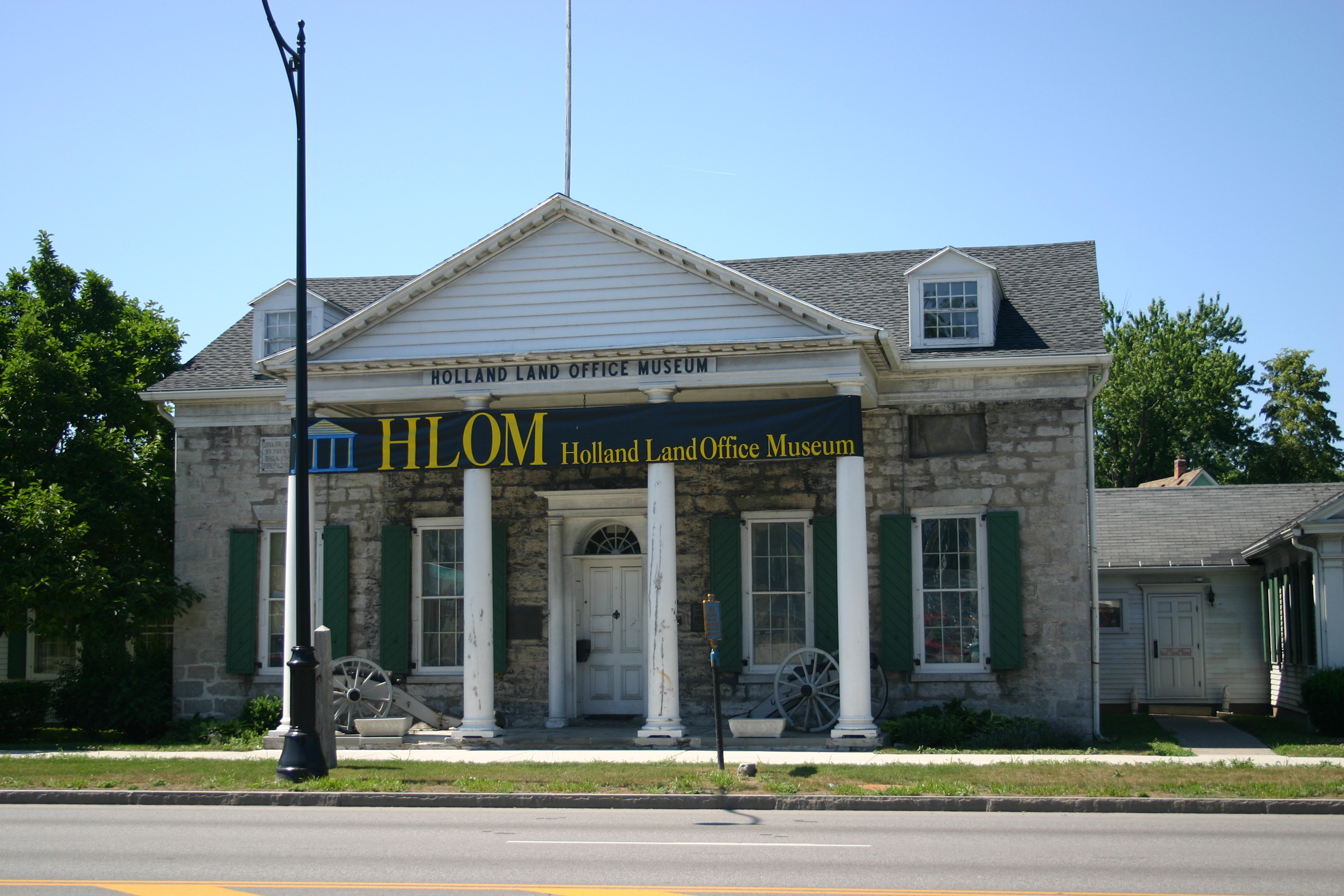
- North elevation, 2005

- Location within New York Location within the United States
- Location: Batavia, NY
- Coordinates: 42°59′56″N 78°11′26″W
- Built: 1815
- Architect: Joseph Ellicott
- NRHP reference No.: 66000521
- NYSRHP No.: 03740.000007

Significant dates
- Added to NRHP: October 15, 1966
- Designated NHL: October 9, 1960
- Designated NYSRHP: June 23, 1980

The Holland Land Office building is located on West Main Street (New York state routes 5, 33 and 63) in downtown Batavia, New York, United States. It is a stone building designed by surveyor Joseph Ellicott and erected in the 1810s.

It was the third and last office of the Holland Land Company, which owned almost all of what is today Western New York. Ellicott presided over the survey, sale and ultimate settlement of a vast tract of land. In 1960 it was declared a National Historic Landmark, the first one in Western New York (Note: The office was among the first 92 National Historic Landmarks announced when the program was created in 1960. The next property to be designated in New York State west of the Genesee River was the Fillmore House in East Aurora in 1974.) and the only one in Genesee County. Today it is a museum, with exhibits about the history of the company and the region.

== Building ==
The building is located on the south side of West Main between Ellicott and Thomas Avenues on the north, two blocks west of the county courthouse and the commercial center of downtown Batavia. To the west is the Oak Street (New York State Route 98) intersection.

Tonawanda Creek is to the south. The office occupies a narrow strip of land between it and the street. On its east the creek comes closer to West Main, leaving only enough room for a sidewalk; a parking lot is located on the west between the building and Oak Street. Across West Main is another parking lot, houses and a commercial building. The area is level, part of the creek's former flood plain.

The land office building itself is a one-and-a-half–story limestone structure with a 47-by-36-foot (14 by 11 m) main block topped with an asphalt-shingled gabled roof. A wooden pedimented entrance portico projects from the north (front) elevation, and two additions are located to the southwest. One is a small one-story cinder block connector to the other, a large L-shaped timber frame wing with about 12 feet (3.7 m) between it and the main block.

Four round stone columns support the pediment, where a denticulated cornice frames an entablature faced in clapboard. Below the cornice are black letters spelling out "Holland Land Office Museum" on the plain frieze. The two six-over-six double-hung sash windows on either side of the main entrance have louvered shutters with stone sills and splayed lintels. Recessed panels top each window on the upper story.

On either side of the pediment small gabled dormer windows with eight-over-eight double-hung sash pierce the roof. Side fenestration consists of two windows similar to the front windows at ground level, two small windows on the second floor and a fanlight at the gable apex. The roofline has an overhanging eave with a continuation of the denticulation on the pediment.

Smooth round pilasters frame the recessed main entrance, topped by a rounded fanlight. It opens into a central hall. There is one room on the east and two on the west. Both are used as exhibit space. There are eight wall vaults, originally used to store records. One has its original 10-foot-tall (3.0 m) metal door. Steel I-beams have been added to support the roof, and braces are visible in the west parlor. The upper stories are used for office and exhibit space, as are the additions.

== History ==
The Holland Land Company was formed late in the 18th century by a group of Dutch investors to dispose of lands they had acquired west of the Genesee River, originally owned by the state of Massachusetts and the Seneca Nation of the Iroquois Confederacy until the 1797 Treaty of Big Tree. The company had acquired them from Robert Morris, who had financed the Continental Army during the Revolutionary War, and needed to sell due to financial troubles in some of his other land dealings. In 1794 they hired Pennsylvania surveyor Joseph Ellicott to survey the five million acres (2 million ha) they had acquired in what is now Western New York and the adjacent areas of Northwestern Pennsylvania. After the survey was finished and the land subdivided into townships, Ellicott was appointed agent in 1800.

Working from the present site, Ellicott not only oversaw the sale of individual properties but functioned as the area's sole regional planner, reporting to Paolo Busti, the company's agent in Philadelphia, by mail. He was, a contemporary historian wrote, "the single most powerful person in the area for the first two decades of the century." His decision to sell the land in small parcels rather than large blocks, despite the objections of the company's trustees who wanted the land sold quickly, resulted in settlement by small farmers rather than the establishment of quasi-feudal manors as had occurred in the Hudson Valley. Drawing on his experience laying out the city of Washington, D.C., for Pierre L'Enfant, he surveyed and planned the cities of Buffalo and Batavia.

The company's first office was a log cabin; Ellicott cleared the first tree on the site. In 1809 it was replaced with a timber-frame building, in turn replaced by the existing structure in 1815, the third and last one. It was built of stone to be fireproof and better protect the records it kept. At that time it stood alone on a two-acre (8,100 m^{2}) lot. Ellicott left his position in 1820; the company remained in existence until the mid-1850s, by which time all the land had been sold and all the debts retired.

The building was eventually sold. It became first a music school, and then a church. To support those uses modifications were made to the interior.

In 1894 the Holland Purchase Historical Society was formed to restore the building and adapt it for museum use. Later that year the building was dedicated to Morris's memory at a ceremony attended by Morris's descendants and members of the Cabinet of President Grover Cleveland, who had himself begun his political career in Buffalo. It was staffed by members of the local Daughters of the American Revolution (DAR) chapter.

During World War II the DAR leased the building to the local chapter of the American Red Cross. At that time the cinder block addition was built on the rear. After the war, in 1948, the county's Board of Supervisors voted to assume ownership.

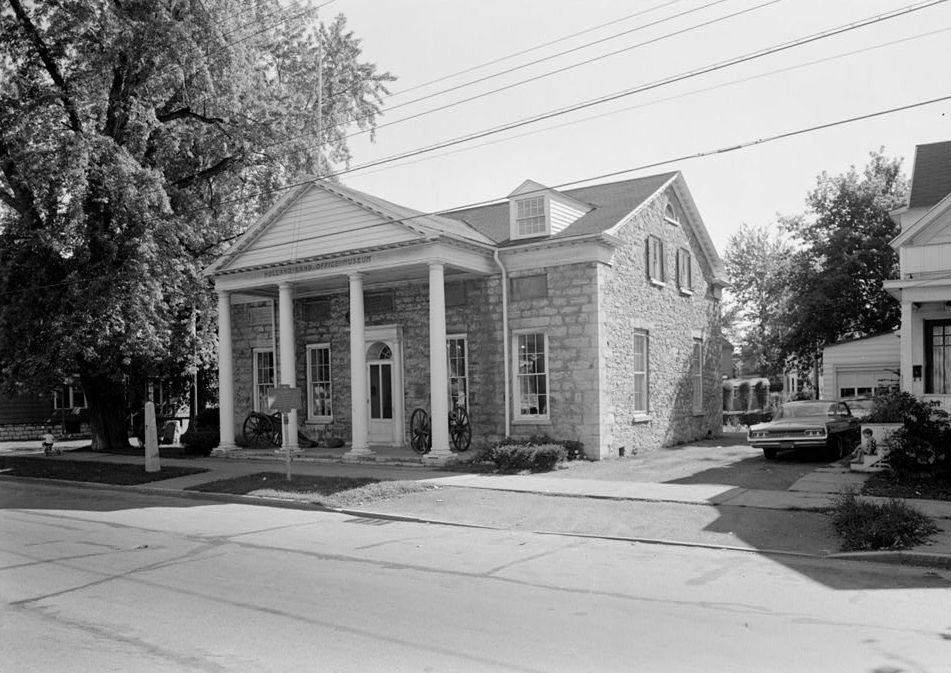
Building in 1965

The western frame wing, known as the Robert Morris Wing, was added around 1970. To build it and the parking lot, a house next door was demolished. Seven years later it received an east wing, originally used by the county historian. Since that office moved to separate quarters nearby it has been used for the museum. The final addition came in 1982, a small room attached to the back of the wing's rear to exhibit the county's 12½-foot (3.8 m) gibbet.

== Museum ==
The museum's collection includes many artifacts of Ellicott's original survey of the region. These include not only his chains and transit, but the written records of the survey. An original copy of Ellicott's 1804 map, valued in the five figures, hangs on one wall.

Iroquois artifacts on display include a ca. 1700 succotash bowl, wampum beads and a model of a longhouse, the tribe's traditional habitation. There is also an armchair used by Seneca elder Eli Parker, and a charcoal sketch of Seneca Wolf Clan chief Red Jacket, wearing the silver medal George Washington gave him. They are exhibited in a room named for Parker.

== See also ==
- List of National Historic Landmarks in New York
- National Register of Historic Places listings in Genesee County, New York
