= Treaty of Hartford (1786) =

1786 treaty between New York and Massachusetts

The Treaty of Hartford was a treaty concluded between New York and Massachusetts on December 16, 1786 in Hartford, Connecticut, over the ownership of the land which now comprises Western New York.

== Background ==
New York and Massachusetts both claimed the same land for different reasons: New York based its claim on various treaties that it concluded with Indian tribes, whereas Massachusetts invoked its colonial charter, which described its boundaries as extending westward to the Pacific Ocean. The area in dispute included all of western New York State west of, approximately, Seneca Lake, extending all the way to the Niagara River and Lake Erie, and north to south from the shore of Lake Ontario to the Pennsylvania border.

== Terms ==
New York and Massachusetts agreed to divide the rights in question with a treaty signed December 16. The states agreed that all of the land in question, about 6 million acres (24,000 km^{2}), would be recognized as part of New York State. Massachusetts, in return, obtained the right of preemption, the title to all of the land, giving it the exclusive right to extinguish by purchase the possessory rights of the Indian tribes (except for a narrow strip along the Niagara River, the title to which was recognized to belong to New York). The compact also provided that Massachusetts could sell or assign its preemptive rights.

== Aftermath ==
On April 1, 1788, Massachusetts sold its rights to the entire six million acres (24,000 km^{2}) to Oliver Phelps and Nathaniel Gorham, known as the Phelps and Gorham Purchase, for $1,000,000, payable in three equal annual installments, and payable in specie or in certain Massachusetts securities then trading at about 20 cents on the dollar, the money used to repay some of the state's debt from the Revolutionary War. Similar western boundary issues involving these and other states were resolved by the Northwest Ordinance passed by the Congress of the Confederation in July 1787.

== See also ==
- Phelps and Gorham Purchase
- Holland Land Company
- The Holland Purchase
- The Morris Reserve
- The Pulteney Association
