= Étienne de Carheil =

French Jesuit priest and missionary

Étienne de Carheil (20 November 1633 – 27 July 1726) was a French Jesuit priest who became a missionary to the Iroquois and Huron Indians in the New World. He served as the chief Jesuit missionary to the Native Americans of the Straits of Mackinac area from 1686 until about 1702. In this duty, he clashed often with the secular leader of Fort de Buade, the French commandant Antoine de la Mothe Cadillac.

== Biography ==
Born at Carentoir, France, on 20 November 1633, de Carheil entered the Society of Jesus on 30 August 1652. He studied in Amiens, La Flèche, and Bourges, taught in Rouen and Tours, and was ordained a Catholic priest in 1666. He thereupon departed for Canada, where he spent two years preparing in Quebec before setting out on his missionary work.

The first mission where de Carheil worked was in Cayuga, where he remained until forced out by the natives in 1684. He taught grammar at the Jesuit College in Quebec for three years, before receiving an assignment to the Mission of Mackinac. Due to his opposition to the brandy trade, de Carheil came into conflict with Antoine de la Mothe Cadillac, the secular commandant of Fort de Buade. By 1703, this conflict grew so severe that de Carheil was forced to return to Quebec.

After his return to Quebec, de Carheil spent most of the rest of his life ministering to the French settlers in Montreal and elsewhere. He wrote two unpublished volumes under the title Racines Huronnes.
