= Iroquoian peoples =

Indigenous peoples of eastern North America

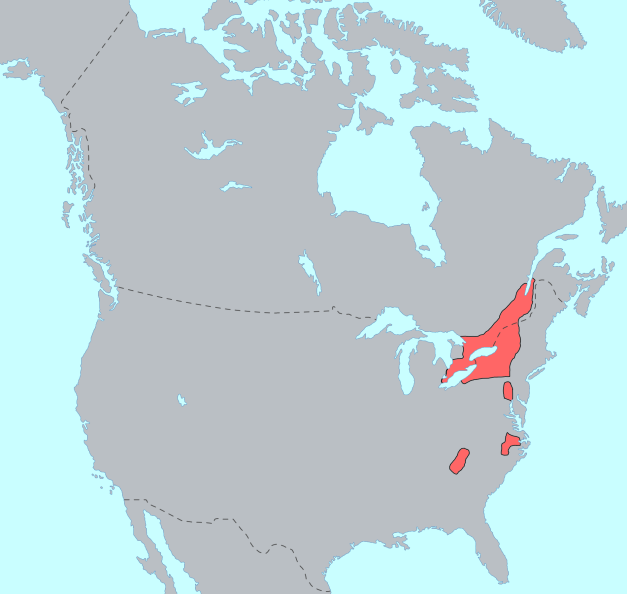
Pre-contact distribution of Iroquoian languages

The Iroquoian peoples, also rarely referred to as Nadoueks, are an ethnolinguistic group of peoples in eastern North America. Their traditional territory, sometimes referred to by scholars as Iroquoia, stretches from the mouth of the St. Lawrence River in the north, to the Cape Fear River in the south. Now they are distributed throughout Canada and the United States as far west as Oklahoma.

Some Iroquoian-speaking peoples are the member nations of the Haudenosaunee, Wendat, Tionontate and Neutral confederacies. Other peoples include the Erie, Wenro, Susquehannock, Cherokee and Meherrin.

There is archaeological evidence for Iroquoian peoples in the area around present-day New York state by approximately 500 to 600 AD. Their distinctive culture seems to have developed by about 1000 AD.

== History ==
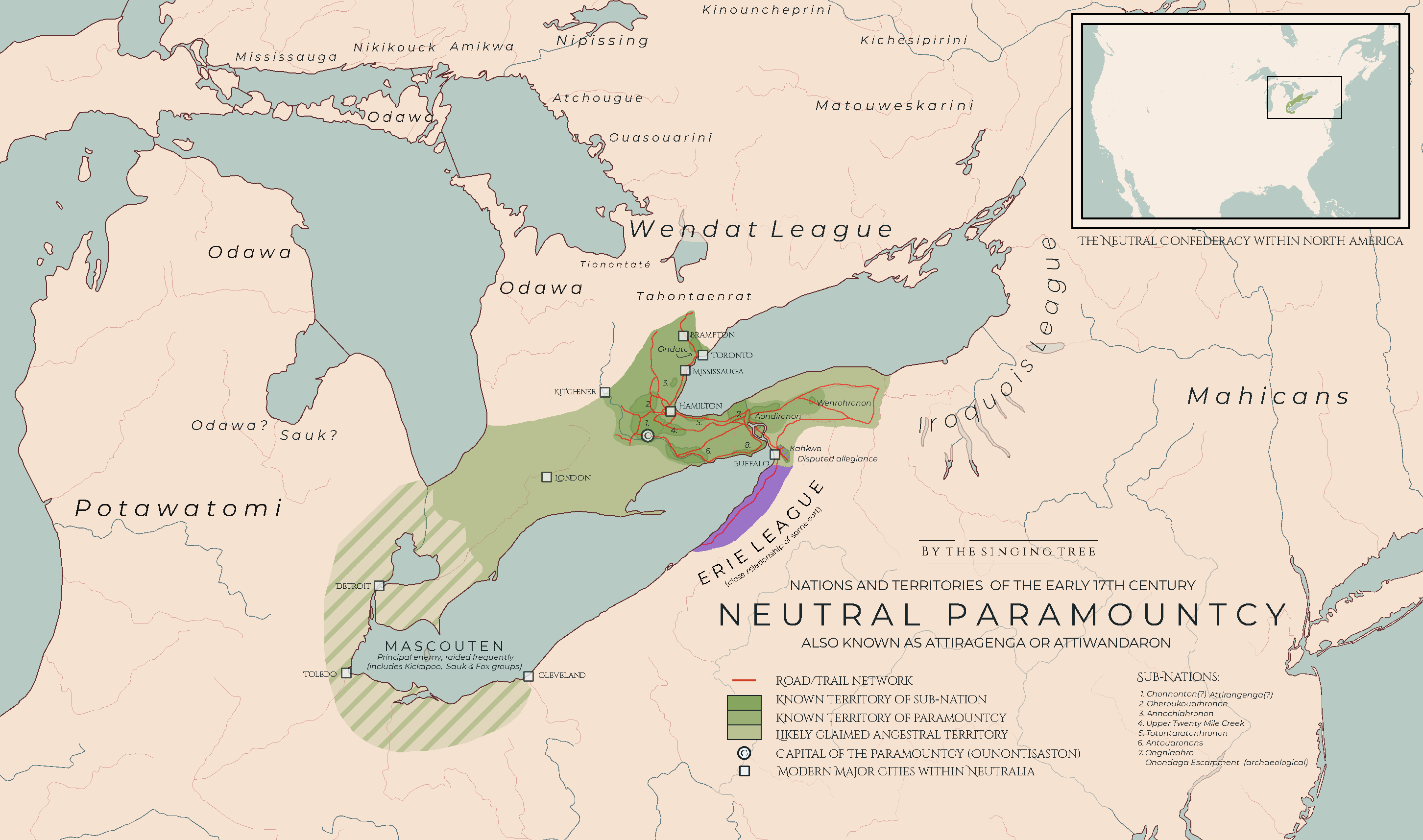
Map of the Neutral Confederacy in 1600

Haudenosaunee mythology tells that the Iroquoian peoples have their origin in a woman who fell from the sky, and that they have always been on Turtle Island.

Iroquoian societies were affected by the wave of infectious diseases resulting from the arrival of Europeans. For example, it is estimated that by the mid-17th century, the Wendat population had decreased from 20,000–30,000 to about 9000, while the Tionontati population dropped from around 8000 to 3000.

== Archaeology ==
The Hopewell tradition describes the common aspects of an ancient pre-Columbian Native American civilization that flourished in settlements along rivers in the northeastern and midwestern Eastern Woodlands from 100 BC to 500 AD, in the Middle Woodland period. The Hopewell tradition was not a single culture or society, but a widely dispersed set of populations connected by a common network of trade routes. This is known as the Hopewell exchange system.

There is archaeological evidence for Iroquoian peoples "in the area around present-day New York state by approximately 500 to 600 AD. Their distinctive culture seems to have developed by about 1000 AD."

=== Ontario Iroquoian tradition ===
The Ontario Iroquoian tradition was conceptualized by the archaeologist J. V. Wright in 1966. It encompasses a group of archaeological cultures considered by archaeologists to be Iroquoian or proto-Iroquoian in character. In the Early Ontario Iroquois stage (likely beginning around AD 900), these comprised the Glen Meyer and Pickering cultures, which clustered in southwestern and eastern Ontario respectively.

During the Middle Ontario Iroquois stage, rapid cultural change took place near the beginning of the 14th century, and detectable differences between the Glen Meyer and Pickering cultures disappeared. The Middle Ontario Iroquois stage is divided into chronological Uren and Middleport substages, which are sometimes termed as cultures. Wright originally attributed the increase in homogeneity to a "conquest theory", whereby the Pickering culture became dominant over the Glen Meyer and the former became the predecessor of the later Uren and Middleport substages. Archaeologists opposed to Wright's theory have since criticized it on a number of levels, such as questioning whether there is substantial evidence that the Glen Meyer and Pickering cultures were meaningfully distinct from each other. Their work led to the reclassification of some Uren and Middleport sites as Glen Meyer, and, by the 1990s, archaeologists were increasingly unable with the evidence available to distinguish sub-groups of sites from the period in Ontario into distinct archaeological cultures.

In one 1990 paper, Ronald Williamson stated that Glen Meyer and Pickering cultures might represent "two ends of a continuum of spatial variability extending across southern Ontario," in his arguments against the classification of Ontario Iroquoian sites into groups based on material culture. This dispute paralleled other contemporary discussions over the usefulness of the older system of material culture classification which had mostly been devised in the 1960s and 1970s, such as criticism of the usefulness of the pre-Ontario Iroquoian Saugeen complex as a conceptual model. In a 1995 article, Dean Snow took a more middling view, supporting the idea of Glen Meyer and Pickering cultures being distinct, but also acknowledging that the "conquest theory" was considered lacking enough evidence by archaeologists by that point.

The Point Peninsula complex was an indigenous culture located in Ontario and New York from 600 BC to 700 AD (during the Middle Woodland period). This culture, along with other complexes eventually developed into the several Iroquoian-speaking nations of Pennsylvania, Ontario and New York.

== Culture ==
Many Iroquoian speaking peoples have matrilineal kinship systems and lived in large multi-family longhouses. They were historically semi-sedentary farmers who lived in large towns enclosed by palisades as a defence against enemy attack. Iroquoian speaking peoples supplemented their diet with hunting and gathering. Many scholars have argued that Iroquoian-speaking peoples have a belief in a powerful force called Orenda.

== List of Iroquoian-speaking peoples ==
- Cherokee (ᏣᎳᎩ Tsalagi, ᎠᏂᏴᏫᏯᎢ Aniyvwiya or Anigiduwagi): of southern Appalachia
- †Coree, of the Carolina Tidewater region
- †Erie (Eriechronon): of the southern coast of Lake Erie
- Haudenosaunee (Iroquois) of Upstate New York, Ohio and the north shore of Lake Ontario
  - Mohawk (Kanienʼkehá꞉ka)
  - Seneca (Onödowáʼga)
  - Cayuga (Gayogo̱hó꞉nǫʼ)
  - Oneida (Onʌyoteˀa·ká·)
  - Onondaga (Onoñdaʼgegáʼ)
  - Tuscarora (Skarù꞉ręˀ): of the Tidewater and Piedmont of North Carolina, later Upstate New York
    - Akawenteaka
    - Katenuaka
    - Skaruren
- †Honniasont: of the upper Ohio River Valley
- †Massawomeck (identified with Monongahela): of central Appalachia
- †Meherrin (Kauwets'a꞉ka): of the Tidewater region
- †Neusiok, of the Carolina Tidewater region
- †Neutrals (Chonnonton or Attawandaron): of the Ontario Peninsula
  - Annochiahronon
  - Antouaronon
  - Aondironon
  - Chonnonton
  - Oheroukouarhronon
  - Ondato
  - Ongniaahra
  - Totontaratonhronon
- Nottoway (Cheroenhaka): of the Tidewater region
- †Scahentoarrhonon: of the Wyoming Valley
- †St. Lawrence Iroquoians: of what is the areas around Montreal and Quebec City
- †Susquehannock (Conestoga): of the Susquehanna River watershed
  - †Akhrakouaeronon
  - †Onojutta-Haga
- †Tehotitachsae: of the northern Susquehanna River watershed
- Tionontati (Tobacco or Petun): of the southern shore of the Georgian Bay
  - Hatinnaariska
  - Oskennonton
- Wendat (Huron): of Wendake on the southern shore of the Georgian Bay
  - Attignawantan
  - Attigneenongnahac
  - Arendarhonon
  - Tahontaenrat
  - Ataronchronon
- †Wenrohronon (Wenro): of Upstate New York
- †Westo (Chichimeco or Richahecrian): of the Southeastern United States
- Wyandot (Huron): of what is now Michigan and Ohio

== List of Iroquoian governments ==
- Cayuga Nation of New York: of New York, United States
- Cheroenhaka (Nottoway) Indian Tribe: of Virginia, United States (state recognized)
- Cherokee Nation: of Oklahoma, United States
- †Cherokee Nation (1794–1907): of the Southeastern United States
- Eastern Band of Cherokee Indians: of North Carolina, United States
- Mohawk Nation of Akwesasne (St. Regis Mohawk Tribe): of Quebec and Ontario, Canada and New York, United States
- Mohawks of Kahnawà:ke: of Quebec, Canada
- Mohawks of Kanesatake: of Quebec, Canada
- Mohawks of the Bay of Quinte First Nation: of Tyendinaga Mohawk Territory in Ontario, Canada
- Nottoway Indian Tribe of Virginia: of Virginia, United States (state recognized)
- Oneida Indian Nation: of New York, United States
- Oneida Nation of the Thames: of Ontario, Canada
- Oneida Nation of Wisconsin: of Wisconsin, United States
- Onondaga Nation: of New York, United States
- Seneca–Cayuga Nation: of Oklahoma, United States
- Seneca Nation of New York: of New York, United States
- Six Nations of the Grand River: of Ontario, Canada
  - Bearfoot Onondaga First Nation
  - Konadaha Seneca First Nation
  - Lower Cayuga First Nation
  - Lower Mohawk First Nation
  - Niharondasa Seneca First Nation
  - Oneida First Nation
  - Onondaga Clear Sky First Nation
  - Tuscarora First Nation
  - Upper Cayuga First Nation
  - Upper Mohawk First Nation
  - Walker Mohawk First Nation
- Tonawanda Seneca Nation: of New York, United States
- Tuscarora Nation: of New York, United States
- United Keetoowah Band of Cherokee Indians: of Oklahoma, United States
- Wahta Mohawks: of Ontario, Canada
- Wendat Nation: of Quebec, Canada
- Wyandot of Anderdon Nation: of Michigan, United States (peer recognized)
- Wyandot Nation of Kansas: of Kansas, United States (peer recognized)
- Wyandotte Nation: of Oklahoma, United States

== See also ==
- Algonquian-speaking peoples
