= Cayuga Nation of New York =

Federally recognized tribe of Cayuga people, based in New York, United States

Total population
- Approximately 450-550

Regions with significant populations
- United States ( (New York (state)) New York)

Languages
- English, Cayuga

Religion
- Haudenosaunee mythology, Longhouse religion, Christianity

Related ethnic groups
- Lower Cayuga and Upper Cayuga First Nations, Seneca-Cayuga Nation, other Haudenosaunee nations

The Cayuga Nation of New York is a federally recognized tribe of Cayuga people, based in New York, United States. Other organized tribes with Cayuga members are the federally recognized Seneca-Cayuga Nation of Oklahoma and the Canadian-recognized Lower Cayuga and Upper Cayuga First Nations of the Six Nations of the Grand River in Ontario, Canada, who do not receive federal recognition in the United States.

== History ==
The name Cayuga (Gayogo̱hó꞉nǫʼ) means "People of the wet lands."

They belong to the Iroquoian language family, and were one of the original Five Nations of the Haudenosaunee, who traditionally lived in New York. The Five Nations were the Mohawk, Oneida, Onondaga, Seneca and Cayuga. When the Tuscarora joined the Haudenosaunee Confederation in 1722, the confederacy became known as the Six Nations.

In early times, the Cayuga lived primarily between Owasco and Cayuga lakes, which lay between the territory of the Onondaga and Seneca. Jesuits founded missions among the Cayuga in the mid-17th century. In 1660, there were approximately 1,500 Cayuga.

In the beginning of the 18th century, the Cayuga primarily lived in three villages, composed of at least 30 longhouses. About 500 people lived in each of these villages. The Cayuga became trading partner with the French from Canada and were active in the beaver fur trade. They also traded with the Wyandot for birch bark goods.

All the Haudenosaunee nations except the Oneida were allied with the British in the American Revolution. During the war, Cayuga villages such as Coreorgonel, Chonodote and Goiogouen were destroyed during the Sullivan Expedition of 1779. Along with the British, the Cayuga were defeated in the war. The British gave up both their and Indian claims to lands in treaty negotiations, and the Haudenosaunee were forced to cede their lands to the United States.

A series of federal laws passed in the 1790s known as the "Nonintercourse Act" required all land purchases involving native tribes to be approved by the federal government.

On November 11, 1794, the Cayuga people ratified the Treaty of Canandaigua, signed by approximately 50 Rotiyanehson and leaders of the Haudenosaunee as well as Timothy Pickering on behalf of President George Washington and the United States of America. Among the treaty's numerous provisions, the Cayuga agreed to officially cede a large portion of their ancestral land in exchange for a permanent 64,000 acre reservation at the north end of Cayuga Lake.

However, after the signing of the treaty, New York State's government entered into land sales and leases with the Cayuga Nation, without the approval of the United States Congress. As the state of New York did not have the authority to deal directly with the tribes, the Cayuga contend, the transactions were illegally brokered. Today, the Cayuga Nation of New York, the ancestors of the Cayuga signatories to the Treaty of Canandaigua, point to the 1794 treaty as evidence of their legal sovereignty over approximately 64,000 acres at the north end of Cayuga Lake.

=== Land claims ===
The Cayuga Nation of New York began a land claim action on November 19, 1980, in the United States District Court for the Northern District of New York to pursue legislative and monetary restitution for land taken from it by the State of New York during the 18th and 19th centuries. In 1981, the Seneca-Cayuga Tribe of Oklahoma was added as a plaintiff in the claim.

A jury trial on damages was held from January 18 to February 17, 2000. The jury returned a verdict in favor of the Cayuga Indian Nation of New York and the Seneca-Cayuga Tribe of Oklahoma, finding current fair market value damages of $35 million and total fair rental value damages of $3.5 million. The jury gave the state a credit for the payments it had made to the Cayugas of about $1.6 million, leaving the total damages at approximately $36.9 million. On October 2, 2001, the court issued a decision and order which awarded a prejudgment interest award of $211 million and a total award of $247.9 million.

Both the plaintiffs and the defendants appealed this award. On June 28, 2005, the United States Court of Appeals for the Second Circuit rendered a decision that reversed the judgment of the trial court. It ruled in favor of the defendants, based on the doctrine of laches. Essentially the court ruled that the plaintiffs had taken too long to present their case, when it might have been equitably settled earlier.

The Cayuga Indian Nation of New York sought review of this decision by the Supreme Court of the United States, which was denied on May 15, 2006.

Additional disputes over land and sovereignty claims have continued, including, as of 2024, the decision of Cayuga and Seneca Counties to refuse to allow the Cayuga Nation police to be part of the 911 system.

== Location ==
Under the 1794 Treaty of Canandaigua, land for the Cayuga was reserved, namely 64,000 acres at the north end of Cayuga Lake. In 2005, the Cayuga Nation began to purchase land within its claimed territory at the north end of Cayuga Lake, beginning with 70 acres in Union Springs.

== Government ==
The Cayuga Nation is headquartered in Seneca Falls, New York. They are governed by a council of chiefs, chosen by clan mothers. The Cayuga Nation is part of the Haudenosaunee Confederacy.

Since August 2003, Clint Halftown serves as the federal representative to the Bureau of Indian Affairs, although a number of self-described "traditionalists" in the community do not recognize his administration. According to a councilor in the Halftown-led government, traditionalists make up nearly 10 percent of the 550 enrolled members.

There is also a Cayuga Nation Trial Court. Since 2018, the trial judge of this course has been Joseph E. Fahey.

== Tribal enrollment ==
Children of tribal mothers are enrolled at birth. As the tribe has a matrilineal kinship system, children are considered to be born into the mother's clan. Descent and inheritance are passed through the maternal lines. The tribe requires members to have a mother who is Cayuga.

== Economy ==
The nation controls several businesses, including Lakeside Entertainment, which includes four Class II Gaming facilities, Lakeside Trading convenience stores; Harford Glen Water, a water bottler; Gakwiyo Garden, which grows 35 types of fruits and vegetables and provides food for over one hundred member households; Cayuga Corner, which sells fresh produce and flowers; and Arrow Head Hemp, which produces a variety of CBD products.

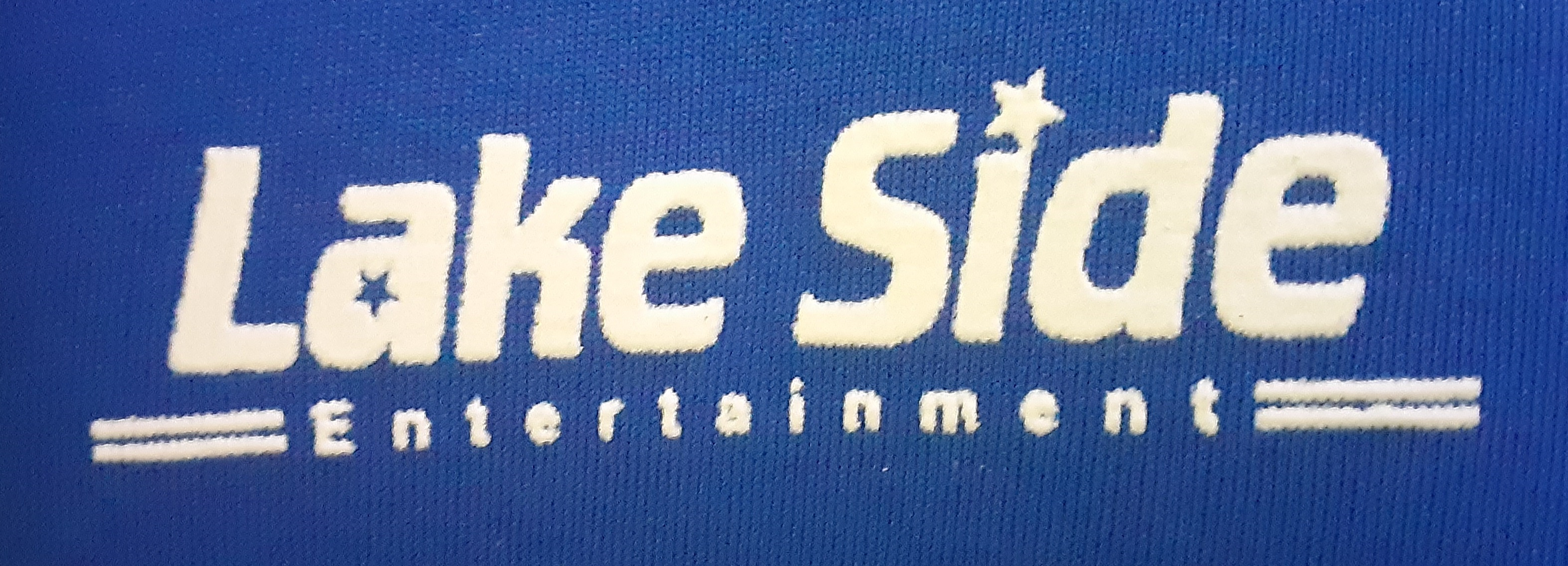
Logo for Lake Side Entertainment of the Cayuga Nation

=== Lakeside Entertainment ===
The Cayuga Nation had initially become involved in the prospect of casino gaming in 2004 as part of an eventually voided settlement with the state of New York that would have seen a Las Vegas-style casino open in the Catskills.

Lakeside Entertainment is owned by the Cayuga nation and as of 2024 consists of four Class II Gaming facilities.

=== Lakeside Trading Post ===
The Cayuga Indian Nation owns two pieces of property from which it operates its Lakeside Trading Post, which consists of both a convenience store and gas station. One store is located in the Town of Seneca Falls and the other in the village of Union Springs.

On November 25, 2008, the Seneca and Cayuga County Sheriffs' Departments seized all the cigarettes at two locations of the Lakeside Trading Post because of the Cayuga refusal to remit state excise taxes on sales. The Cayuga have said that as a sovereign nation, they do not owe taxes to the state. The Seneca County District Attorney said the counties were in the right because the Cayugas did not own any sovereign land in either county. The state contended that only by operating on sovereign land, i.e. a reservation, would the tribe be exempt from the taxes.

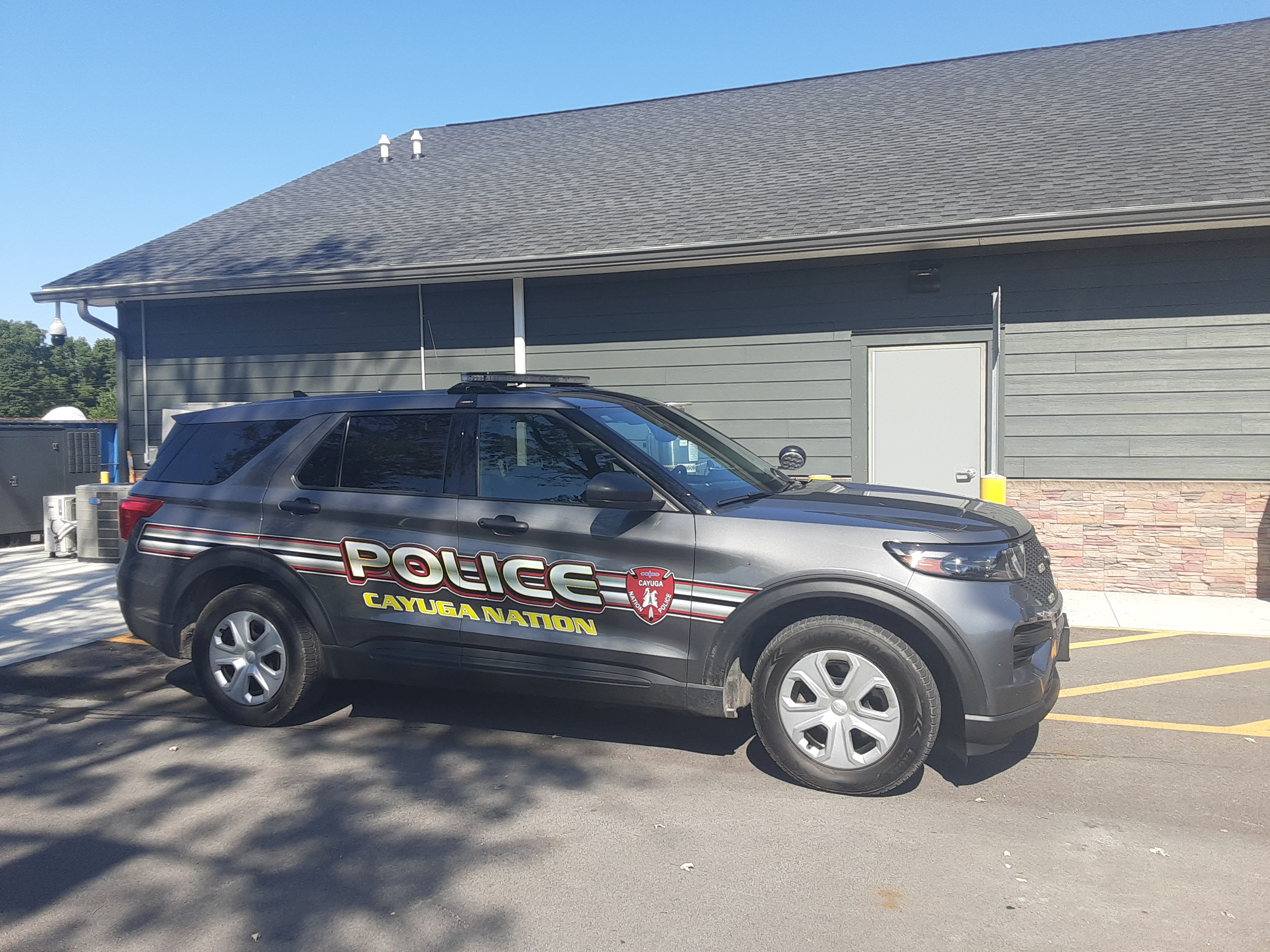
Cayuga Nation police car

The Cayuga Indian Nation sought to enjoin the authorities from initiating any prosecution and to compel them to return the seized cigarettes. New York Supreme Court Justice Kenneth Fisher denied the Cayugas' motion for a preliminary injunction and dismissed the action.

On February 22, 2020, around 2 AM, Cayuga Nation Police raided the Seneca Falls gas station and demolished it along with other buildings on the property including a school house for Indigenous ceremonies, a daycare center, and some tiny homes that were being lived in at that time.

== See also ==
- St. Regis Mohawk Reservation
- Oneida Indian Nation
- Onondaga Nation
- Seneca Nation of Indians
- Tonawanda Band of Seneca
