= Glebe Farm 40B =

- Indian reserve
- Glebe Farm Indian Reserve No. 40B
- Location within Southern Ontario
- Coordinates: 43°08′N 80°14′W
- Country: Canada
- Province: Ontario
- County: Brant
- First Nations: Bay of Quinte Mohawks, Bearfoot Onondaga, Delaware, Konadaha Seneca, Lower Cayuga, Lower Mohawk, Niharondasa Seneca, Oneida, Onondaga Clear Sky, Tuscarora, Upper Cayuga, Upper Mohawk & Walker Mohawk

Area
  - Land: 0.41 km^{2} (0.16 sq mi)
- Time zone: UTC-5 (EST)
  - Summer (DST): UTC-4 (EDT)

Glebe Farm 40B is a shared First Nations reserve within the city of Brantford. It is shared between the Bay of Quinte Mohawks, Bearfoot Onondaga, Delaware, Konadaha Seneca, Lower Cayuga, Lower Mohawk, Niharondasa Seneca, Oneida, Onondaga Clear Sky, Tuscarora, Upper Cayuga, Upper Mohawk & Walker Mohawk First Nations.
