= Tehotitachsae =

North American indigenous people

The Tehotitachsae were an Iroquoian indigenous nation of North America originally from the area of Bradford County, Pennsylvania. Their principal village, Gohontoto, was on the site of the present Borough of Wyalusing.

== History ==
Moravian Bishop John F. Cammerhoff wrote of a visit in 1750, "Here, they tell me, was in early times an Indian town, traces of which are still noticeable, e. g. corn-pits, etc., inhabited by a distinct nation (neither Aquinoschioni, i. e. Iriquois, nor Delawares), who spoke a peculiar language and were called Tehotitachsae; against these the Five Nations warred, and rooted them out. The Cayugas for a time held a number of them, but the Nation and their language are now exterminated and extinct."

Remnants of the Tehotitachsae most likely were assimilated into the Cayuga. Their former territories in Pennsylvania later settled by the Lenape, who in 1752 established a settlement called M'chwihillusink on the site of Gohontoto. This would later become Wyalusing.
