= Delaware First Nation =

Lenape First Nation in southern Ontario

The Delaware First Nation is a Lenape First Nation in southern Ontario and is a member nation of the Six Nations of the Grand River. Its reserves include the shared Glebe Farm 40B and Six Nations of the Grand River First Nation reserves.

== See also ==
- List of federally recognized tribal governments of Lenape
  - Delaware First Nation of Six Nations, Ontario (member of the Haudenosaunee Confederacy)
  - Delaware Nation, Oklahoma
  - Delaware Nation at Moraviantown, Ontario (Christian Munsee)
  - Delaware Tribe of Indians, Oklahoma
  - Munsee-Delaware Nation, Ontario
  - Stockbridge-Munsee Community, Wisconsin (Partially Lenape, also Mohican)
