= Chonodote =

18th-century town of the Cayuga nation of the Haudenosaunee

Coordinates: 42°45.282′N 76°42.164′W

Chonodote was an 18th-century town of the Cayuga nation of the Haudenosaunee in what is now upstate New York, US. It was located about four and a half miles south of Goiogouen, on the east side of Cayuga Lake. Earlier, during the 17th century, this town was known as Deawendote, or Village of the Constant Dawn.

Chonodote was known as Peachtown to the Continental Army because of its orchard of over a thousand peach trees. It consisted of about fourteen longhouses and stood very near the site of the present-day village of Aurora, New York.

On September 24, 1779, the town became the last one to be destroyed by the Sullivan-Clinton Campaign, under the command of William Butler:

As remorseless as a cannon shot, the axe levelled every tree though burdened with its loads of luscious fruit, and the freshly ripened corn was gathered only to be destroyed. At 10 o'clock A. M., the torch was applied to the dwellings, and as the crackling flames lifted their fiery heads over this scene of havoc and destruction.

Following the war, many Cayuga relocated to the Seneca reservation at Tonawanda.

Archaeological digging has pinpointed the likely location of Chonodote on the northern end of Aurora. Potsherds have been found and evidence of the use of coal in the 1770s was discovered. A historical marker denoting the location of Chonodote (Peachtown) can be found in front of the Aurora Inn, at N 42° 45.282 W 076° 42.164.

In September 2000, Wells College in Aurora held a festival, Return to Chonodote, honoring the area's Haudenosaunee past and present. The event was co-sponsored by SHARE (Strengthening Haudenosaunee and American Relations through Education), members of the Cayuga Nation and Onondaga Nation, and Ithaca College.
