= Seneca–Cayuga Nation =

Federally recognized Native American tribe in Oklahoma

Total population
- 5,059 (2011)

Regions with significant populations
- United States (Oklahoma)

Languages
- English, Seneca, Cayuga

Religion
- Longhouse, Christian

Related ethnic groups
- other Seneca and Cayuga people, other Haudenosaunee people

The Seneca–Cayuga Nation, formerly known as the Seneca–Cayuga Tribe of Oklahoma, is one of three federally recognized tribes of Seneca people and two recognized tribes of Cayuga people in the United States. Located in Oklahoma, the nation had more than 5,000 people in 2011. They have a tribal jurisdictional area in the northeast corner of Oklahoma and are headquartered in Grove, Oklahoma. They are descended from Haudenosaunee who had relocated to Ohio from New York state in the mid-18th century.

The other two federally recognized Seneca tribes are located in New York: the Seneca Nation of Indians and the Tonawanda Seneca Nation. There is one other federally recognized Cayuga tribe, the Cayuga Nation, headquartered in New York.

== Government ==
Map of Seneca-Cayuga Nation's tribal jurisdictional area (OTSA) and nearby jurisdiction areas.

The Seneca–Cayuga Nation has an elected system of government, consisting of two governing bodies: the Reservation Business Committee (RBC), which acts as the Tribe's legislative council and oversees the daily governing of the Tribe, and the Grievance Committee, which acts as the Tribe's judiciary.

The Reservation Business Committee consists of seven members: Chief, Second Chief, Secretary-Treasurer, and four RBC Members. The current chief is Charlie Diebold. The Grievance Committee consists of five members. In odd years, Chief, First and Third RBC Members, and First, Third, and Fifth Grievance Committee Members are elected. In even years, the Second Chief, Secretary-Treasurer, Second and Fourth RBC Members, and Second and Fourth Grievance Committee Members are elected. All elected Business Committee terms are four years.

As of 2025, the current administration is:

- Chief: Charles Diebold
- 2nd Chief: Curt Lawrence
- Secretary/Treasurer: Kim Guyett
- 1st Councilperson: Cynthia Donohue Bauer
- 2nd Councilperson: Amy Nuckolls
- 3rd Councilperson: Jason WhiteEagle
- 4th Councilperson: Tonya Blackfox

== Tribal Citizenship ==
The Seneca–Cayuga criteria for Nation citizenship are:

- All persons of Indian blood whose names appear on the official census roll of the Tribe as of January 1, 1937, when it was reorganized;
- All children born since the date of the said roll, both of whose parents are citizens of the Nation;
- Any child born of a marriage between a citizen of the Seneca–Cayuga Nation and a citizen of any other Indian tribe who chooses to affiliate with the Seneca–Cayuga Nation;
- Any child born of a marriage between a citizen of the Seneca–Cayuga Nation and any other persons if such child is admitted to citizenship by the Council of the Seneca–Cayuga Nation.

There are 5,059 enrolled citizens of the nation, of which 1,174 live in Oklahoma.

== Programs ==
- Administration on Aging Program
- Adult Education Program
- Adult Vocational Training Program
- Child Care and Development Program
- CDGB Program
- Higher Education Program
- Housing Improvement Program and NAHASDA
- Indian Child Welfare Program
- Johnson O'Malley Program
- Social Services/Child Protection Program
- Substance Abuse Program
- Tax Commission
- Tribal Enrollment

The Seneca-Cayuga Language and Cultural Society hosts cultural events, such as Stomp dances. The tribe has a community building in Grove for public events.

== Economic development ==
The Seneca–Cayuga have a Class II casino near Grove, Oklahoma. They also have a cigarette manufacturing plant there, which makes their Skydancer brand cigarettes. By investing a large portion of their gaming and industry profits into their community, since the late 20th century and passage of Indian gaming laws, the Seneca–Cayuga Tribe has gone from being a destitute people to enjoying a fair amount of social prosperity.

The tribe issues its own tribal vehicle tags. Their estimated annual economic impact is $751,000. In 2009, they made $98,000 in charitable donations.

== History ==
The Seneca, or Onödowaʼga꞉ʼ (meaning "People of the Great Hill"), traditionally lived in what is now New York between the Genesee River and Canandaigua Lake. The name Cayuga (Gayogo̱hó꞉nǫˀ) means "People of the Great Swamp" and they also lived in what was later known as western New York.

Both tribes were part of the Iroquoian languages family. The Seneca are the largest tribe of the Five Nations (or League of the Iroquois) who traditionally lived in New York. The Five Nations are the Mohawk, Oneida, Onondaga, Cayuga and Seneca. The latter were the westernmost nation, known as "Keepers of the Western Door." When the Tuscarora joined the Haudenosaunee Confederation in 1722, after migrating from North Carolina, the confederacy was known as the Six Nations. The Tuscarora are also an Iroquoian-language people who had migrated to the South centuries before. They were driven back north by warfare with other tribes and English colonists.

In the mid to late 18th century, a confederation of Haudenosaunee Indian bands was pushed west from throughout the Northeast. Its people moved west to escape encroachment by the colonists. It included the Mingo (from the upper Ohio River), Susquehannock, Cayuga, Mohawk, Oneida, Tuscarora, Onondaga and the Seneca of Sandusky (who had lived in New York at the outset of the American Revolution). After the Revolutionary War, some of the Cayuga moved to Ohio, where the US granted them a reservation along the Sandusky River. They were joined there by the Shawnee of Ohio and members of other Haudenosaunee bands.

All the main Haudenosaunee nations except the Oneida and Tuscarora had allied with the British in the Revolution. They were considered defeated in the war. The British gave up both their and Haudenosaunee claims to lands in treaty negotiations, and the Haudenosaunee were forced to cede their lands to the United States. Most relocated to Canada after the Treaty of Canandaigua in 1794, although some bands were allowed small reservations in New York. New York made separate purchases and leases of land from the Indians, which were not ratified by the US Congress.

The Indian Claims Commission's opinion in Strong v. United States (1973), 31 Ind. Cl. Comm 89 at 114, 116, 117 details the separation of this small band of the Seneca–Cayugas' ancestors (who were known as Mingoes) from the Six Nations. It noted their migration to Ohio in the mid-18th century:

"The Seneca–Cayuga Tribe of Oklahoma constitutes the descendants of those Mingoes who were living in Ohio in the 18th century ... About 1800 these Senecas of Sandusky were joined by a portion of the Cayugas who had sold their lands in New York ... Based upon the record in these proceedings, we believe that by the time of the 1794 Canandaigua Treaty, the Mingoes in Ohio were small, independent bands, no longer politically subservient to the Six Nations of New York ... [B]eginning shortly before 1750, the Mingoes themselves were asserting their independence from the Six Nations of New York ... The only conclusion which can be reached from an analysis of the activities of these Mingoes in Ohio during the 18th century is that they constituted independent bands who often acted in concert with other Ohio Indians. Their actions do not support the conclusion that they remained politically affiliated with the Six Nations of New York."

In 1831, the Tribe sold their land in Ohio and accepted a reservation in the Cherokee Nation in Indian Territory (present-day Oklahoma). They were a prosperous people who, preparing to leave Ohio, loaded their considerable baggage (clothing, household goods, tools, seed) onto a steamboat to sail to St. Louis. The trip to their new home took eight months, plagued by delays, blizzards, disease, and death. Upon their arrival in Indian Territory, the Haudenosaunee band found their assigned lands overlapped those of the Cherokee.

Another band (the Mixed Band of Seneca and Shawnee) traded their Ohio lands for a tract in Indian Territory, which turned out to be wholly within the Cherokee Nation. An 1832 treaty, the first made by the U.S. with the immigrant Indians within the boundaries of present-day Oklahoma, adjusted the boundaries and created the "United Nation of Seneca and Shawnee."

During the American Civil War, the Indian Territory became a battleground as Confederate sympathizers dominated several tribes. Many Seneca and Cayuga people who favored the Union fled to Kansas for safety, although the state was also subject to insurgent violence. Following the war, in 1867, federal negotiators sold part of the Seneca–Cayuga lands to various tribes. They arranged for separation of the Shawnee (who became recognized as the Eastern Shawnee Tribe of Oklahoma).

In 1881, a band of Cayuga from Canada joined the Seneca Tribe in Indian Territory. In 1902, shortly before Oklahoma became a state, 372 citizens of the joint tribe received individual land allotments in exchange for becoming US citizens and withdrawing from the traditional tribe, in order to facilitate acceptance of the territory as a state.

Today, the tribal roll numbers approximately 5,000 citizens, many of whom live throughout Ottawa and Delaware counties. The tribal headquarters is located 10 miles from Grove, Oklahoma.

The current Seneca–Cayuga Nation is chartered as a Federal Corporation under the Act of June 26, 1936, by which Oklahoma encouraged the tribes to reorganize their governments.

On May 15, 2014, the U.S. Department of Interior, Bureau of Indian Affairs, Miami Agency conducted a referendum election to change the Constitution and Bylaws at the request of the Seneca-Cayuga Tribe of Oklahoma Business Committee. As a result of this referendum, the citizens voted to change the name to the Seneca–Cayuga Nation.

== New York land claims ==
Despite having left New York more than two centuries ago, the Seneca–Cayuga Nation (SCT) closely followed emerging land claim cases in the state in the late 20th century. It attempted to join the Cayuga Nation in its suit for land claims in New York. The Seneca Cayuga Tribe successfully enjoined the Cayuga Land Claim, per Federal Judge McCurn's ruling in both the Cayuga Land Claim and SCT v Town of Aurealius. The Seneca-Cayuga Tribe (SCT) has claimed that they are more Cayuga than Seneca; hence the Cayuga Land Claim. There are 5,000 SCT citizens compared to 300 Cayuga citizens in New York; some of the SCT tried to assert their claims to the Cayuga Reservation over the citizens and descendants who have lived there for generations. The Seneca–Cayuga Tribe asserted that its citizens were equally descendants of the Cayuga Nation.

But the U.S. Indian Claims Commission in Strong v. United States (1973) ruled that ancestors of the Seneca–Cayuga were not a party to the treaties between the Cayuga Nation and New York. Their ancestors had already left the state before 1794, when the treaties were made following the American Revolution. Therefore, the Claims Commission found that the Seneca–Cayuga should not have any claim based on the loss of land that the Cayuga suffered in New York as a result of the 1794 Treaty of Canandaigua.

Similarly, the Seneca–Cayuga Nation attempted to intervene in the land claim suit which the Seneca Nation of Indians brought against New York. This related to land around Cuba, New York. Again, the courts ruled that the Seneca–Cayuga had no standing in a case with roots in treaties between the Seneca Nation and the state of New York following the American Revolution, as their ancestors had left the state and settled in Ohio well before that time. The Seneca Nation of Indians ultimately reached a settlement with the state of New York in relation to their claim to property around Cuba Lake.

The tribe applied to the Bureau of Indian Affairs for the opportunity to purchase land in New York and have it taken into trust. They wanted to be able to operate a gambling casino within proximity to New York's major population centers. The US Department of the Interior is still evaluating the tribe's trust application.
