= Bearfoot Onondaga First Nation =

Bearfoot Onondaga First Nation is an Onondaga First Nation in southern Ontario. It is a member of the Six Nations of the Grand River. Its reserves include the shared Glebe Farm 40B reserve in Brantford.
