= Konadaha Seneca First Nation =

Seneca First Nation in Ontario, Canada

Konadaha Seneca
- Band No. 251
- People: Seneca people
- Treaty: Haldimand Proclamation
- Province: Ontario

Land
- Main reserve: Six Nations of the Grand River
- Reserve: Glebe Farm 40B
- Land area: 183.2 km^{2} (70.7 sq mi)

Population (2024)
- On reserve: 206
- On other land: 4
- Off reserve: 439
- Total population: 649

Tribal Council
- Six Nations of the Grand River

Website
- www.sixnations.ca

The Konadaha Seneca First Nation is a Seneca First Nation in southern Ontario, and is a member nation of the Six Nations of the Grand River. Its reserves include the shared reserves of Glebe Farm 40B and the Six Nations of the Grand River First Nation.
