= Onondaga Clear Sky First Nation =

Onondaga First Nation in Ontario, Canada

The Onondaga Clear Sky First Nation is an Onondaga First Nation in southern Ontario, and a member nation of the Six Nations of the Grand River. Its reserves include the shared reserves of Glebe Farm 40B and the Six Nations of the Grand River First Nation.
