= Cayuga people =

Indigenous nation of North America

Cayuga Gayogo̱hó꞉nǫˀ
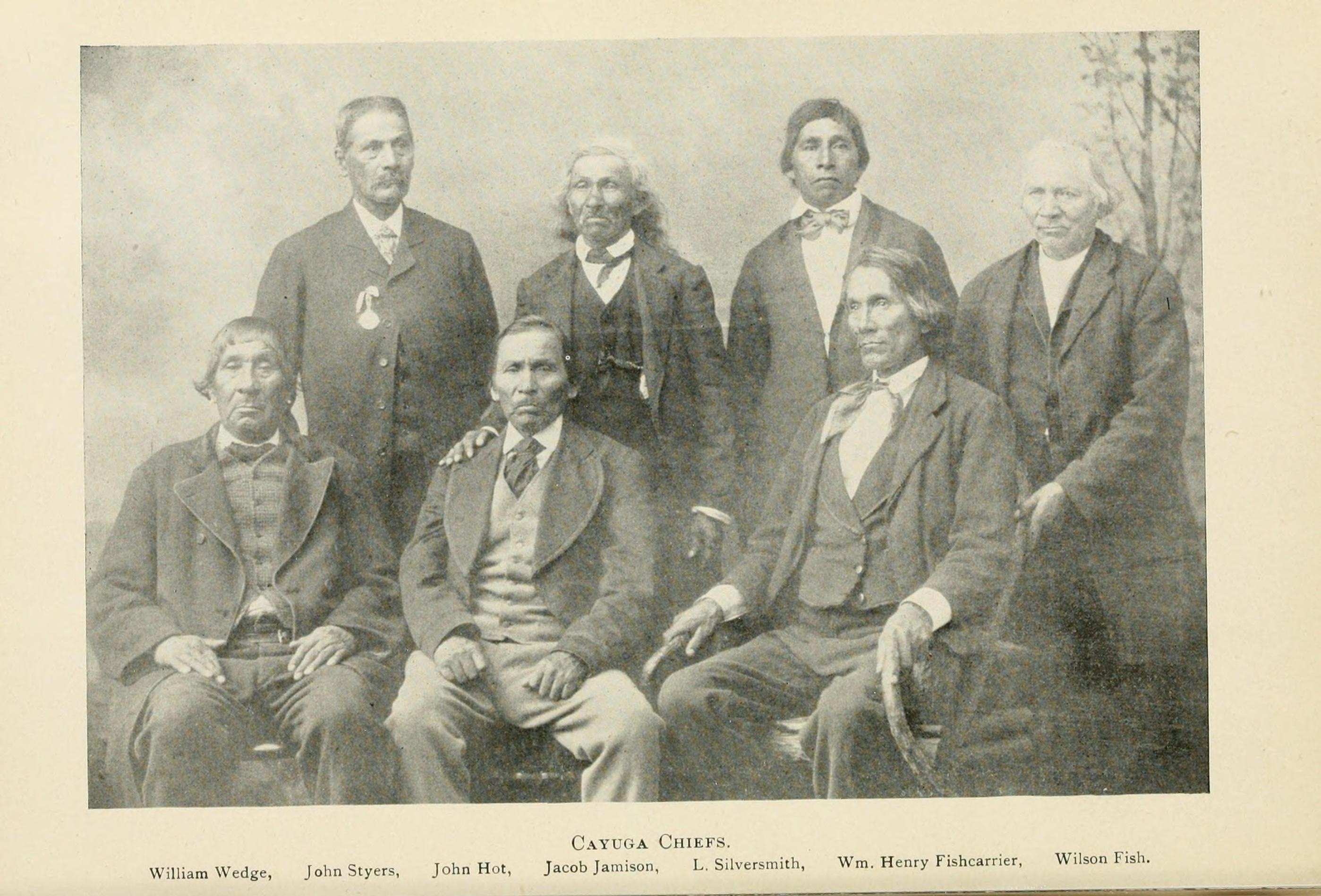
- Cayuga leaders c. 1901

Total population
- 12,000+ (450 in New York; 5,000 in Oklahoma; 7,000 in Ontario)

Regions with significant populations
- Ontario (Canada); New York and Oklahoma (United States)

Languages
- Cayuga, English, other Iroquoian languages

Religion
- Haudenosaunee mythology, Longhouse religion, Christian denominations

Related ethnic groups
- Seneca people, Onondaga people, Oneida people, Mohawk people, other Iroquoian peoples

The Cayuga (Cayuga: Gayogo̱hó꞉nǫˀ IPA: [gɑjogo̥hóːnõʔ], lit. 'People of the Great Swamp') are one of the five original constituent nations of the Haudenosaunee (Iroquois), a confederacy of Iroquoian Indigenous peoples in New York. The Cayuga homeland lies in the Finger Lakes region along Cayuga Lake, between their league neighbors, the Onondaga to the east and the Seneca to the west.

Today, Cayuga people belong to the Lower Cayuga and Upper Cayuga First Nations of the Six Nations of the Grand River in Ontario, and the federally recognized Cayuga Nation of New York and the Seneca-Cayuga Nation of Oklahoma. Some also live at the Cattaraugus Reservation among the Seneca Nation of Indians.

== History ==
Political relations between the Cayuga, the British, and the Thirteen Colonies during the American Revolution were complicated and variable, with Cayuga warriors fighting on both sides (as well as abstaining from war entirely). Most of the Haudenosaunee nations allied with the British, in part hoping to end encroachment on their lands by colonists. In 1778, various Haudenosaunee bands, oft allied with British-colonial loyalists (Tories) conducted a series of raids along the frontier from Connecticut to New York and into south-central Pennsylvania threatening much of the Susquehanna Valley. From the revolutionary government's point of view in Philadelphia, several of these were atrocities, and in the early summer that body proceeded to order Washington to send regiments to quell these disturbances.

Consequently, in 1779, General George Washington of the Continental Army appointed General John Sullivan and James Clinton to lead the Sullivan Expedition, a retaliatory military campaign designed to unseat the Haudenosaunee Confederacy and prevent the nations from continuing to attack New York militias and the Continental Army. The campaign mobilized 6200 troops and devastated the Cayuga and other Haudenosaunee homelands, destroying 40-50 villages. Those destroyed included major Cayuga villages such as Cayuga Castle and Chonodote (Peachtown). The expedition, with attacks from the spring through the fall, also destroyed the crops and winter stores of the Haudenosaunee, to drive them out of the land. Survivors fled to other Haudenosaunee nations, or to Upper Canada. Some were granted land there by the British in recognition of their loyalty to the Crown.

Following the end of the war, the Central New York Military Tract was established in order to grant land bounties to veterans. The tract originally included a Cayuga reservation surrounding the north end of Cayuga Lake, but the reservation was given up a few years later in a treaty with the state.

Cayuga.

Some Seneca and Cayuga had left the area earlier even as Tuscarora were migrating north in the early decades of the 1700s, going west of the Alleghenies to the long depopulated Ohio Country lands; settling in Western Pennsylvania, West Virginia, and Eastern Ohio. These groups became known as the Mingo or "Black Mingo", for they had a bad reputation, so were able to take in their kin after that systematic bloodletting in 1779. After the Sullivan Campaign, more Cayuga joined them, as well as some other bands of Haudenosaunee who left New York before the end of the Revolutionary War. As the American Revolution was nearing its end, settlers resumed trekking west of the Alleghenies in a trickle that by 1810, became a flood. Other eastern Amerindians, joined by eastward remnants of Susquehannock and large groups of Delaware peoples had also traveled the ancient trails through the gaps of the Allegheny to found settlements such as Kittanning (village) and others in the Ohio Valley. Only weakened, cobbled together tribes such as the Mingo inhabited the land, which was still mostly empty; creating a situation drawing settlers west in increasing numbers. By 1831 those Indians left in the lands east of Ohio were encouraged by bigotry, and at times forcibly removed to the Indian Territory, in what became Oklahoma. Their remnants, the Seneca-Cayuga Nation, are a federally recognized tribe.

On November 11, 1794, the (New York) Cayuga Nation (along with the other Haudenosaunee nations) signed the Pickering Treaty with the United States, by which they ceded much of their lands in New York to the United States, forced to do so as allies of the defeated British. It was the second treaty the United States entered into. It recognized the rights of the Haudenosaunee as sovereign nations. The Pickering Treaty remains an operating legal document; the U.S. government continues to send the requisite gift of muslin fabric to the nations each year.

The state of New York made additional treaties with the tribes but failed to get them ratified by the Senate. As it lacked the constitutional authority to deal directly with the tribes, individual tribes have sued for land claims since the late 20th century, charging New York had no authority for their actions. The state rapidly arranged sales of more than 5 million acres (20,000 km^{2}) of former Haudenosaunee lands at inexpensive prices to encourage development in the state. It also granted some western lands to war veterans in lieu of pay. Speculators bought up as much land as they could and resold it to new settlers. Land-hungry Yankees from New England flooded into New York in waves of new settlement, as did some settlers from the Mohawk Valley. Immigrants also came from the British Isles and France after the war.

== Culture ==
=== Clans ===
Like all Haudenosaunee people, the Cayuga are subdivided into clans of matrilineal descent, led by Clan Mothers. There are six Cayuga clans: Wolf (Honǫtahyǫ́꞉ni꞉), Bear (Hadihnyagwái), Turtle (Hadinyáhdę꞉), Sandpiper (Hodiˀnehsí:yoˀ), Heron (Degaǫhyága̱hne:ˀ), and Hawk (Hodihswę̱ˀgáiyoˀ).

The Cayuga send ten Rotiyanehson to the Haudenosaunee Grand Council, where they are part of the Younger Brother moiety alongside the Oneida people.

== Groups ==
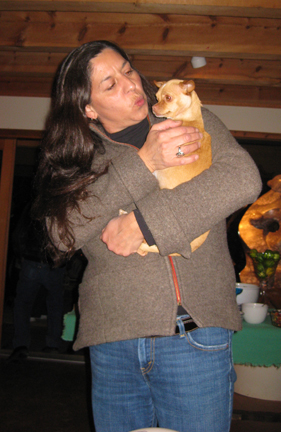
Tammy Rahr, a Cayuga bead artist

There are three Cayuga bands. The two largest, the Lower Cayuga and Upper Cayuga, live in Ontario, both at Six Nations of the Grand River, a reserve recognized by the Canadian government. Two federally recognized tribes of Cayuga constitute the third band in the United States: the Cayuga Nation of New York in Seneca Falls, New York, and the Seneca-Cayuga Nation of Oklahoma.

The Cayuga Nation of New York does not have a reservation. Members have lived among the Seneca Nation on the Cattaraugus Reservation. Since the late 20th century, they have acquired some land in their former homeland by purchase.

== Land claims ==
The Cayuga Nation of New York filed an action on November 19, 1980, in the United States District Court for the Northern District of New York to pursue legislative and monetary restitution for land taken from it by the State of New York during the 18th and 19th centuries. New York had entered into land sales and leases with the Cayuga Nation after the signing of the Treaty of Canandaigua after the American Revolutionary War. Its failure to get approval of the United States Senate meant the transactions were illegal, as the state had no constitutional authority to deal directly with Indian nations. The Treaty of Canandaigua holds that only the United States government may enter into legal discussions with the Haudenosaunee.

In 1981, the Seneca-Cayuga Nation was added as a plaintiff in the claim. Following many years of pre-trial motions, a jury trial on damages was held from January 18-February 17, 2000. The jury returned a verdict in favor of the Cayuga Indian Nation of New York and the Seneca-Cayuga Nation, finding current fair market value damages of $35 million and total fair rental value damages of $3.5 million. The jury gave the state a credit for the payments it had made to the Cayuga of about $1.6 million, leaving the total damages at approximately $36.9 million. On October 2, 2001, the court issued a decision and order which awarded a prejudgment interest award of $211 million and a total award of $247.9 million.

Both the plaintiffs and the defendants appealed this award. On June 28, 2005, the United States Court of Appeals for the Second Circuit rendered a decision that reversed the judgment of the trial court. It ruled in favor of the defendants, based on the doctrine of laches. Essentially the court ruled that the plaintiffs had taken too long to present their case, when it might have been equitably settled earlier.

The Cayuga Indian Nation of New York sought review of this decision by the Supreme Court of the United States, which was denied on May 15, 2006. The time in which the Cayuga Indian Nation could ask the U.S. Supreme Court to rehear the case has passed.

The Nation reclaimed its first land on July 17, 1996, by purchasing 14 acres (57,000 m^{2}) in Seneca Falls, within their 64,000 acres (260 km^{2}) land claim area. On August 2, 1997, a dedication was held where members of all the Haudenosaunee Confederacy nations were present. This purchase began the return of the Cayuga People to their ancestral homelands. They planted a pine tree at this dedication as a symbol that the Cayuga People are still alive and wanting to return. The elder women of the Cayuga Nation broke the ground and planted the pine tree to welcome the return of their people to their home territory.

In December 2005, the S.H.A.R.E. (Strengthening Haudenosaunee-American Relations through Education) Farm (including a house) was signed over to the Cayuga nation by United States citizens who had purchased and developed the 70-acre (280,000 m^{2}) farm in Aurora, New York. This is the first property which the Cayuga Nation has owned since after being forced to cede its lands after the Revolutionary War. It is the first time they have lived within the borders of their ancestral homeland in more than 200 years. The Cayuga continue to debate having the Bureau of Indian Affairs take this land into trust for them. They have been developing projects featuring indigenous planting, cultivation of herbs and medicinal plants, wild plant collection and a seed saving program.

== Population ==
In 1995 there were nearly 450 Cayuga members in New York. In the 21st century, there are about 4,892 combined members of the Cayuga-Seneca Nation in Oklahoma.

The total number of Haudenosaunee is difficult to establish. About 45,000 Haudenosaunee lived in Canada in 1995, more than 39,000 in Ontario and the remainder in Quebec. Among the six nations and federally recognized units in the United States, total tribal enrollment in 1995 numbered about 30,000. In the 2000 US Census, 45,217 respondents identified solely as "Iroquois" (but this does not mean they were enrolled as members); and 80,822 as having "Iroquois" ancestry.

Populations of the Haudenosaunee Members (Six Nations)
Location	Seneca	Cayuga	Onondaga	Tuscarora	Oneida	Mohawk	Combined	Totals
Ontario					3,970	14,051	17,603^{1}	39,624
Quebec						9,631		9,631
New York	7581	448	1596	1200	1,109	5,632		17,566
Wisconsin					10,309			10,309
Oklahoma							4,892^{2}	4,892
Totals	7581	448	1596	1200	15,338	29,314	22,495	82,022

Sources: Oklahoma Indian Affairs Commission: Pocket Pictorial' (2010:33) & Iroquois Population in 1995 by Doug George-Kanentiio.
^{1} Six Nations of the Grand River Territory.
^{2} Seneca-Cayuga Tribe of Oklahoma.

== Notable people ==
- George Edward Bomberry, Physician, first indigenous graduate of McGill University (M.D. C.M. 1875).
- Jenna Clause, actress
- Gary Farmer, actor
- Annessa Hartman, American politician
- Ourehouare, tribal leader
- Robbie Robertson, Canadian musician and lead guitarist of The Band

== See also ==
- Splitlog Church in Cayuga, Oklahoma, founded by a Cayuga member
