= Oneida First Nation =

Indigenous group and First Nation in Canada

The Oneida First Nation is an Oneida First Nation in southern Ontario, and a member of the Six Nations of the Grand River. Its reserves include the shared reserves of Glebe Farm 40B and the Six Nations of the Grand River First Nation.
