= Tuscarora First Nation =

Tuscarora
- Band No. 245
- Skarù:ręˀ
- People: Tuscarora people
- Treaty: Haldimand Proclamation
- Province: Ontario

Land
- Main reserve: Six Nations of the Grand River

Population (2024)
- On reserve: 973
- On other land: 4
- Off reserve: 1515
- Total population: 2492

Tribal Council
- Six Nations of the Grand River

Website
- www.sixnations.ca

Tuscarora First Nation is a Tuscarora First Nation in southern Ontario, and is a member nation of the Six Nations of the Grand River. Its reserves include Glebe Farm 40B and the Six Nations of the Grand River First Nation.
