= Walker Mohawk First Nation =

The Walker Mohawk First Nation is a Mohawk First Nation in southern Ontario, and is a member nation of the Six Nations of the Grand River. Its reserves include the shared reserves of Glebe Farm 40B and the Six Nations of the Grand River First Nation.
