= Lower Cayuga First Nation =

The Lower Cayuga First Nation (Cayuga: Ganedagehó:nǫˀ) is a Cayuga First Nation in southern Ontario, and a member nation of the Six Nations of the Grand River. Its reserves include the shared reserves of Glebe Farm 40B and the Six Nations of the Grand River First Nation.
