= Cayuga language =

Northern Iroquoian language of North America

Cayuga
- Gayogo̱honǫˀnéha꞉ˀ
- Cayuga for "our language"
- Native to: Canada, United States
- Region: Ontario: Six Nations of the Grand River First Nation; New York (state): Cattaraugus Reservation
- Ethnicity: Cayuga people
- Native speakers: <55 in Canada (2016 census)
- Language family: Iroquoian: Northern; Lake Iroquoian; Five Nations; Cayuga

Language codes
- ISO 639-3: cay
- Glottolog: cayu1261
- ELP: Cayuga
- Cayuga is classified as Critically Endangered by the UNESCO Atlas of the World's Languages in Danger.

Cayuga (/kaɪˈjuːɡə/, Cayuga: Gayogo̱honǫˀnéha꞉ˀ IPA: [gɑjogo̥hoːnõʔnéhɑːʔ]) is a Northern Iroquoian language of the Iroquois Proper (also known as "Five Nations Iroquois") subfamily, and is spoken on Six Nations of the Grand River First Nation, Ontario, by around 240 Cayuga people, and on the Cattaraugus Reservation, New York, by fewer than 10.

Cayuga is critically endangered, with only 115 people of the Indigenous population reporting Cayuga as their mother tongue in the 2021 Canadian census. The Cayuga people are working to revitalize the language. As an example of such, Six Nations Polytechnic has developed apps on iOS and study programs in Cayuga, Oneida, Mohawk and others.

== Dialects ==
Cayuga is one of the Northern Iroquoian languages (Otowe̱ˀgéha꞉ˀneha꞉ˀ) and is closely related to Onondaga and especially Seneca.

There are at least two distinct dialects of Cayuga. Two, Lower Cayuga (Ganedagehonǫ́ˀne̱ha꞉ˀ) and Upper Cayuga (Dagęhyatgehonǫ́ˀne̱ha꞉ˀ), are spoken at Six Nations of the Grand River in southern Ontario. Another, called "Seneca-Cayuga", was spoken in Oklahoma until its extinction in the 1980s.

The two dialects of the Cayuga at Six Nations are associated with the two Cayuga longhouses, Sour Springs or “Upper” Cayuga and “Lower” Cayuga. Differences between these two dialects of southern Ontario are known to include two phonological patterns. In the Lower Cayuga (LC) variety, underlying *tj sequences surface as /ky/, e.g. LC gyę꞉gwa’ /kjɛ̃ːkwaʔ/ vs UC ję꞉gwa’ /tjɛ̃ːkwaʔ/. Another apparent difference involves the metrical pattern of Laryngeal Spreading. In Lower Cayuga words, odd-numbered vowels preceding /h/ or /ʔ/ are pronounced with the voice quality of the following consonant. That is to say, such vowels are pronounced with whispered vowels when preceding /h/ or creaky voice before /ʔ/. An example of this occurs in the word for 'nine', gyoHdǫh [kjo̤htõh].

== Phonology ==
=== Modern dialects ===
There are two varieties of Cayuga. The Lower Cayuga dialect is spoken by those of the Lower End of the Six Nations and the Upper Cayuga are from the Upper End. The main difference between the two is that the Lower Cayuga use the sound [kj] and the Upper use the sound [tj]. Also, pronunciation differs between individual speakers of Cayuga and their preferences.

=== Vowels ===
There are five oral vowels in Cayuga, as well as four long vowels, [iː], [aː], [oː], and [eː]. Cayuga also has three nasalized vowels, [ɛ̃], [õ], and [ã]. Both [u] and [ã] are rare sounds in Cayuga. The latter is not phonemic, but surfaces due to a phonological pattern of nasalization, where underlying /a/ becomes [ã] when following a nasal vowel. Sometimes, the sounds [u] and [o] are used interchangeably according to the speaker's preference. After long [eː] and [oː], an [n] sound can be heard, especially when before [t], [d], [k], [ɡ], [ts], and [j].

Vowels can be devoiced as [V̥] allophonically, indicated in the orthography used at Six Nations by underlining them.

Monophthongs
	Front			Back		
	Oral	Long	Nasal	Oral	Long	Nasal
High	/i/ ⟨i⟩	/iː/ ⟨i꞉⟩				
Mid	/e/ ⟨e⟩	/eː/ ⟨e꞉⟩	/ɛ̃/ /ɛ̃ː/ ⟨ę ę꞉⟩	/o/ ⟨o⟩	/oː/ ⟨o꞉⟩	/õ/ /õː/ ⟨ǫ ǫ꞉⟩
Low				/ɑ/ ⟨a⟩	/ɑː/ ⟨a꞉⟩	/ɑ̃/ ⟨a⟩ [sic]

/ɑ̃/ occurs in only a few words. /ɛ̃/ may be pronounced [ʌ̃], and /õ/ may be [ũ].

==== Long vowels ====
Length is important because it alone can distinguish two completely different meanings from one another. For example:
[haʔseʔ] you are going
[haʔseː] you went

==== Devoiced vowels ====
Following are some words that demonstrate what some vowels sound like when they occur before [h]. In words like [ehaʔ], [ẽhaʔ], [ohaʔ], and [õha], [e] and [ẽ] devoiced as [e̥, ẽ̥], sound like a whispered [j], and [o] and [õ] devoiced as [o̥, õ̥], sound like a whispered [w]. Furthermore, the [ã] in [ẽhãʔ] and [õhã] is nasalized because of [ẽ] and [õ]. The consonant before the nasalized vowel becomes voiceless. Also, odd-numbered vowels followed by [h] are devoiced, while even-numbered vowels followed by [h] are not.

=== Consonants ===
Like other Iroquoian languages, Cayuga has a very small consonant inventory.

Consonants
	Alveolar	Palatal	Velar	Glottal
Nasal	n			
Plosive	t ⟨d, t⟩		k ⟨g, k⟩	ʔ ⟨ˀ⟩
Affricate	ts ⟨j, ts⟩			
Fricative	s			
Approximant	ɹ ⟨r⟩	j ⟨y⟩	w	

Allophonic variations that occur in Cayuga:

- /t/ becomes voiced [d] before sonorants. The sound [d] does not exist word-finally.
- /k/ becomes voiced [g] before sonorants.
- /s/ becomes [ʃ] before /i/, /j/ or /ɹ/.
- /ts/ becomes [tʃ] when preceding front vowels /i/ and /e/, and as [dʒ] before sonorants. It can also be heard as [dz] and [ds] freely before [a] and [o], respectively. Speakers may use [dz] and [ds] interchangeably according to the speaker's preference.
- /w/ can be voiceless as [w̥] (sounds like former English ⟨wh⟩, or [ʍ]).
- /j/ can also be voiceless [ȷ̊] (sounds like [hj]).
- /h/:
  - "A vowel devoices if the vowel and a following [h] are in an odd-numbered syllable." For example: the [õ] in [ehjátõ̥hkʷʰaʔ]
  - The vowel is voiced when it and a following /h/ are in an even-numbered syllable and in "absolute word-initial position or in word-final position, or preceded by another [h]." For example: [sʰehóːwih] 'tell her'; [ehjáːtõh] 'she writes'

=== Accent ===
Most words have accented vowels, resulting in a higher pitch. Where the stress is placed is dependent on the "position of the word in the phrase." The default location for stress for nouns is on final vowel. "In words that are at the end of a phrase, accent falls on the 2nd last vowel, the 3rd last vowel, or occasionally, on the 4th vowel from the end of the word." For example:

[neʔ kiʔ tsõːh akaːˈtʰõːteʔ]
'I just heard it'

These sounds are long, especially in an even-numbered position. When nouns and verbs are not at the end of a phrase, accent is placed on the final vowel. For example:

[akaːtʰõːtéʔ tsõːh tʰeʔ niːʔ teʔtéːkẽːʔ]
'I heard it, I didn't see it'

== Morphosyntax ==
Cayuga is a polysynthetic language. As with other Iroquoian languages, the verbal template contains an optional prepronominal prefix, a pronominal prefix (indicating agreement), an optional incorporated noun, a verbal root, and an aspectual suffix. The nominal template consists of an agreement prefix (usually neuter for non-possessed nouns), the nominal root, and a suffix.
