= Seneca people =

Haudenosaunee group of the Eastern Woodlands of North America

Seneca Onödowaʼga꞉ʼ
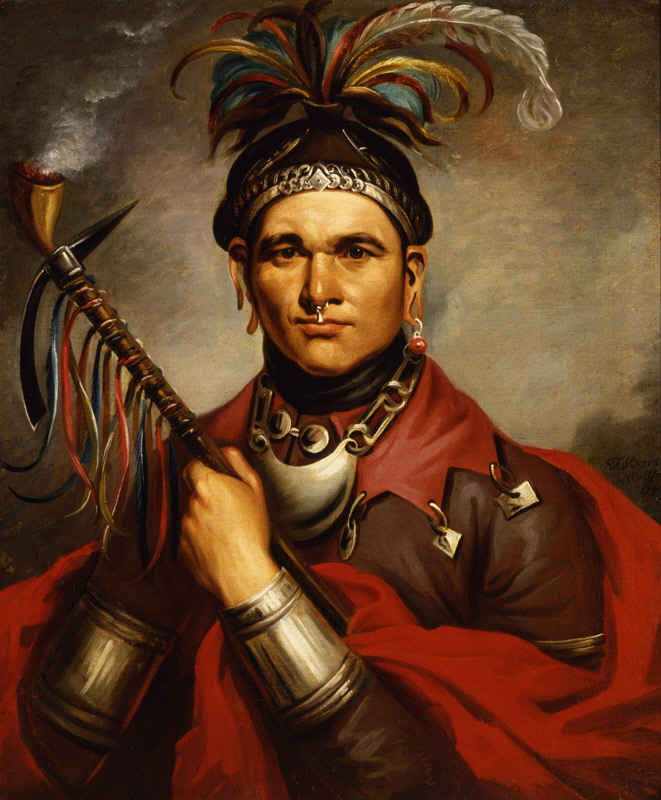
- Gayë́twageh (Cornplanter), portrait by Frederick Bartoli, 1796

Total population
- 11,000

Regions with significant populations
- United States (New York, Oklahoma); Canada (Ontario)
- Cattaraugus Reservation: 2,412
- Tonawanda Reservation: 543
- Six Nations Territory: 1,055
- Allegany Reservation: 1,099

Languages
- Seneca, English

Religion
- Haudenosaunee mythology, Longhouse religion, Christian denominations

Related ethnic groups
- Cayuga, Onondaga, Oneida, Mohawk, other Iroquoian peoples

The Seneca (/ˈsɛnɪkə/ SEN-ik-ə; Seneca: Onödowaʼga꞉ʼ IPA: [onɔ̃dowɑʔgɑːʔ], lit. 'Great Hill People') are a group of Indigenous Iroquoian-speaking people who historically lived south of Lake Ontario, one of the five Great Lakes in North America. Their nation was the farthest to the west within the Six Nations or Haudenosaunee (Iroquois League) in New York before the American Revolution. For this reason, they are called "The Keepers of the Western Door".

In the 21st century, more than 10,000 Seneca live in the United States, which has three federally recognized Seneca tribes. Two of them are centered in New York: the Seneca Nation of Indians, with five territories in western New York near Buffalo; and the Tonawanda Seneca Nation. The Seneca-Cayuga Nation is in Oklahoma, where their ancestors were relocated from Ohio during the Indian Removal. Approximately 1,000 Seneca live in Canada, where they are enrolled in the Konadaha Seneca First Nation and Niharondasa Seneca First Nation at the Six Nations of the Grand River near Brantford, Ontario. They are descendants of Seneca who resettled there after the American Revolution, as they had been allies of the British and forced to cede much of their lands.

== Name ==
The Seneca's own name for themselves is Onödowaʼga꞉ʼ or O-non-dowa-gah, meaning "Great Hill People". The exonym Seneca is based on an ethnonym from an Iroquoian language that originally referred to the Oneida, which was adapted to the phonology of Mohegan, Dutch, and then English. The Dutch applied the name Sennecaas promiscuously to the four western Haudenosaunee nations, the Oneida, Onondaga, Cayuga, and Seneca, but with increasing contact the name came to be applied only to the latter. The French called them Sonontouans. The Dutch name is also often spelled Sinnikins or Sinnekars, which was later corrupted to Senecas.

== History ==
Seneca oral history states that the nation originated in a village called Nundawao, near the south end of Canandaigua Lake, at South Hill. Close to South Hill stands the 865-foot-high (264 m) Bare Hill, known to the Seneca as Genundowa. Bare Hill is part of the Bare Hill Unique Area, which began to be acquired by the state of New York in 1989. Bare Hill had been the site of a Seneca (or Seneca-ancestral people) fort.

The first written reference to this fort was made in 1825 by the Tuscarora historian David Cusick in his history of the Seneca Indians.

The traces of an ancient fort, covering about an acre, and surrounded by a ditch, and formerly by a formidable wall, are still to be seen on top of Bare Hill. They indicate defenses raised by Indian hands, or more probably belong to the labors of a race that preceded the Indian occupation. The wall is now about tumbled down, the stones seem somewhat scattered, and the ground is overgrown with brush.

— S. C. Cleveland, History of Yates County, New York (1873)

In the early 1920s, the material that made up the Bare Hill fort was used by the Town of Middlesex highway department for road fill.

The Seneca historically lived in what is now New York state between the Genesee River and Canandaigua Lake. The dating of an oral tradition mentioning a solar eclipse yields 1142 AD as the year for the Seneca joining the Haudenosaunee. Some recent archaeological evidence indicates their territory eventually extended to the Allegheny River in present-day northwestern Pennsylvania, particularly after the Haudenosaunee destroyed both the Wenrohronon and Erie nations in the 17th century, who were native to the area. The Seneca were by far the most populous of the Haudenosaunee nations, numbering about four thousand by the seventeenth century.

Seneca villages were located as far east as current-day Schuyler County (e.g. Catherine's Town and Kanadaseaga/Ganöndase:ʼgeh), south into current Tioga and Chemung counties, north and east into Tompkins and Cayuga counties, and west into the Genesee River valley. The villages were the homes and headquarters of the Seneca. While the Seneca maintained substantial permanent settlements and raised agricultural crops in the vicinity of their villages, they also hunted widely through extensive areas. They also executed far-reaching military campaigns. The villages, where hunting and military campaigns were planned and executed, indicate the Seneca had hegemony in these areas.

Major Seneca villages were protected with wooden palisades. Ganondagan (Tganödagë:ën), with 150 longhouses, was the largest Seneca village of the 17th century, while Chenussio (Jo’néhsi:yo:h), with 130 longhouses, was a major village of the 18th century.

The Seneca nation has two branches: the western and the eastern. Each branch was individually incorporated and recognized by the Haudenosaunee Confederacy Council. The western Seneca lived predominantly in and around the Genesee River, gradually moving west and southwest along Lake Erie and the Niagara River, then south along the Allegheny River into Pennsylvania. The eastern Seneca lived predominantly south of Seneca Lake. They moved south and east into Pennsylvania and the western Catskill area.

The west and north were under constant attack from their powerful Iroquoian brethren, the Wendat/Wyandot (Huron) To the South, the Iroquoian-speaking Susquehannock (Conestoga) also threatened constant warfare. The Algonquian Mohicans blocked access to the Hudson River in the east and northeast, while to the southeast, the related Lenape people threatened war from eastern Pennsylvania, New Jersey and the Lower Hudson.

The Seneca used the Genesee and Allegheny rivers, as well as the Great Indian War and Trading Path (the Seneca Trail), to travel from southern Lake Ontario into Pennsylvania and Ohio (Merrill, Arch. Land of the Senecas; Empire State Books, 1949, pp. 18–25). The eastern Seneca had territory just north of the intersection of the Chemung, Susquehanna, Tioga and Delaware rivers, which converged in Tioga. The rivers provided passage deep into all parts of eastern and western Pennsylvania, as well as east and northeast into the Delaware Water Gap and the western Catskills. The men of both branches of the Seneca wore the same headgear. Like the other Haudenosaunee, they wore hats with dried cornhusks on top. The Seneca wore theirs with one feather sticking up straight.

=== Contact with Europeans ===
During the colonial period, the Seneca became involved in the fur trade, first with the Dutch and then with the British. This served to increase hostility with competing native groups, especially their traditional enemy, the Wendat, an Iroquoian-speaking people located near Lac Toronto in New France.

Around the turn of the 17th Century the Seneca traded beads with the Dutch produced at places like Factory Hollow.

In 1609, the French allied with the Wendat (Huron) and set out to destroy the Haudenosaunee. The Iroquois-Huron war raged until approximately 1650. Led by the Seneca, the Confederacy began a near 35-year period of conquest over the surrounding peoples following the defeat of its most powerful enemy, the Wendat. The Confederacy conducted Mourning Wars to take captives to replace people lost in a severe smallpox epidemic in 1635. Through raids, they stabilized their population after adopting young women and children as captives and incorporating them into the Five Nations. By the winter of 1648, the Confederacy, led by the Seneca, fought deep into Canada and surrounded the capital of Huronia. Weakened by population losses due to their own smallpox epidemics as well as warfare, the Wendat unconditionally surrendered. They pledged allegiance to the Seneca as their protector. The Seneca subjugated the Wendat survivors and sent them to assimilate in the Seneca homelands.

In 1650, the Seneca attacked and defeated the Neutrals to their west, then attacked and defeated the Erie to their southwest in 1653. Survivors of both the Wendat and Erie were subjugated by the Seneca and relocated to the Seneca homeland. The Seneca took over the vanquished people's traditional territories in western New York.

In 1675, the Seneca defeated the Andaste (Susquehannock) to the south and southeast. The Confederacy's hegemony extended along the frontier from Canada to Ohio, deep into Pennsylvania, along the Mohawk Valley and into the lower Hudson in the east. They sought peace with the Algonquian-speaking Mohican, who lived along the Hudson River. Within the Confederacy, Seneca power and presence extended from Canada to what would become Pittsburgh, east to the future Lackawanna and into the land of the Minnisink on the New York /New Jersey border.

The Seneca tried to curtail the encroachment of European settlers. This increased tensions and conflict with the French to the north and west, and the English and Dutch to the south and east. As buffers, the Confederacy resettled conquered peoples between them and the European settlers, with the greatest concentration of resettlements on the lower Susquehanna.

In 1685, King Louis XIV of France sent Marquis de Denonville to govern New France in Quebec. Denonville set out to destroy the Seneca Nation and in 1687 landed a French armada with "the largest army North America had ever seen" at Irondequoit Bay. Denonville struck straight into the seat of Seneca power and destroyed many of its villages, including the Seneca's eastern capital of Ganondagan. Fleeing before the attack, the Seneca moved further west, east and south down the Susquehanna River. Although great damage was done to the Seneca homeland, the Seneca's military might was not appreciably weakened. The Confederacy and the Seneca moved into an alliance with the British in the east.

=== Senecas' expanding influence and diplomacy ===
In and around 1600, the area currently comprising Sullivan, Ulster and Orange counties of New York was home to the Lenape, an Algonquian-speaking people whose territory extended deep along the coastal areas of the mid-Atlantic coast, up into present-day Connecticut as well as the western part of Long Island. The Lenape nation was Algonkian-speaking and made up of the Unami, Minnisink and Esopus bands, differentiated according to their territories. These bands later became known as the Munsee, based on their shared dialect. (Folts at pp 32) The Munsee inhabited large tracts of land from the middle Hudson into the Delaware Water Gap, and into northeast Pennsylvania and northwest New Jersey. The Esopus inhabited the Mid-Hudson valley (Sullivan and Ulster counties). The Minnisink inhabited northwest New Jersey. The Unami inhabited the southern Susquehanna and Delaware water gaps. The Minnisink-Esopus trail, today's Route 209, helped tie this world together.

To the west of the Lenape were the Iroquoian-speaking Andaste/Susquehannock. To the east of the Lenape lay the encroaching peoples of Dutch New Netherland. From Manhattan, up through the Hudson, the settlers were interested in trading furs with the Susquehannock occupying territory in and around current Lancaster, Pennsylvania. As early as 1626, the Susquehannock were struggling to get past the Lenape to trade with the Dutch in New Amsterdam (Manhattan). In 1634, war broke out between the Unami and the Susquehannock, and by 1638, the defeated Unami became tributaries to the Susquehannock.

The Haudenosaunee Confederacy to the north was growing in strength and numbers, and the Seneca, as the most numerous and adventurous, began to travel extensively. Eastern Seneca traveled down the Chemung River to the Susquehanna River. At Tioga the Seneca had access to every corner of Munsee country. Seneca warriors traveled the Forbidden Path south to Tioga to the Great Warrior Path to Scranton and then east over the Minnisink Path through the Lorde's valley to Minisink. The Delaware River path went straight south through the ancient Indian towns of Cookhouse, Cochecton and Minnisink, where it became the Minsi Path.

Using these ancient highways, the Seneca exerted influence in what is today Ulster and Sullivan counties from the Dutch colonial era onward. Historical evidence demonstrating Seneca presence in the Lower Catskills includes:

In 1657 and 1658, the Seneca visited, as diplomats, Dutch colonial officials in New Amsterdam.

In 1659 and 1660, the Seneca interceded in the First Esopus War, which was going on between the Dutch and Esopus at current-day Kingston. The Seneca chief urged Stuyvesant to end the bloodshed and "return the captured Esopus savages".

In 1675, after a decade of warfare between the Haudenosaunee (mainly the Mohawk and Oneida) and the Andaste/Susquehannock, the Seneca finally succeeded in vanquishing their last remaining great enemy.(Parker at pp 49) Survivors were colonized in settlements along the Susquehanna River and were assimilated into the Seneca and Cayuga people.

In 1694, Captain Arent Schuyler, in an official report, described the Minnisink chiefs as being fearful of being attacked by the Seneca because of not paying wampum tribute to these Haudenosaunee.

Around 1700, the upper Delaware watershed of New York and Pennsylvania became home of the Minnisink Indians moving north and northwest from New Jersey, and of Esopus Indians moving west from the Mid-Hudson valley.

By 1712, the Esopus Indians were reported to have reached the east Pepacton branch of the Delaware River, on the western slopes of the Catskill Mountains.

From 1720 to the 1750s, the Seneca resettled and assimilated the Munsee into their people and the Confederacy. Historical accounts had noted the difficulties encountered by the Seneca during this period and noted a dissolution of their traditional society under pressure of disease and encroachment by European Americans. But fieldwork at the 1715–1754 Seneca Townley-Read site near Geneva, New York, has recovered evidence of "substantial Seneca autonomy, selectivity, innovation, and opportunism in an era usually considered to be one of cultural disintegration". In 1756, the Confederacy directed the Munsee to settle in a new satellite town in Seneca territory called Assinisink (where Corning developed) on the Chemung River. In this period, they developed satellite towns for war captives who were being assimilated near several of their major towns. The Seneca received some of the Munsee's war prisoners as part of their negotiations.

At a peace conference in Easton, Pennsylvania in 1758, the Seneca chief Tagashata required the Munsee and Minnisink to conclude a peace with the colonists and "take the hatchet out of your heads, and bury it under ground, where it shall always rest and never be taken up again". A large delegation of Haudenosaunee attended this meeting to demonstrate that the Munsee were under their protection.

In 1759, as colonial records indicate, negotiators had to go through the Seneca in order to have diplomatic success with the Munsee.

Despite the French military campaigns, Seneca power remained far-reaching at the beginning of the 18th century. Gradually, the Seneca began to ally with their trading partners, the Dutch and British, against France's ambitions in the New World. By 1760 during the Seven Years' War, they helped the British capture Fort Niagara from the French. The Seneca had relative peace from 1760 to 1775. In 1763 a Seneca war party ambushed a British supply train and soldiers in Battle of Devil's Hole, also known as the Devil's Hole massacre, during Pontiac's Rebellion.

After the American Revolutionary War broke out between the British and the colonists, the Seneca at first attempted to remain neutral but both sides tried to bring them into the action. When the rebel colonists defeated the British at Fort Stanwix, they killed many Seneca onlookers.

=== Interactions with the United States ===
==== Pre-American Revolution Involvement ====
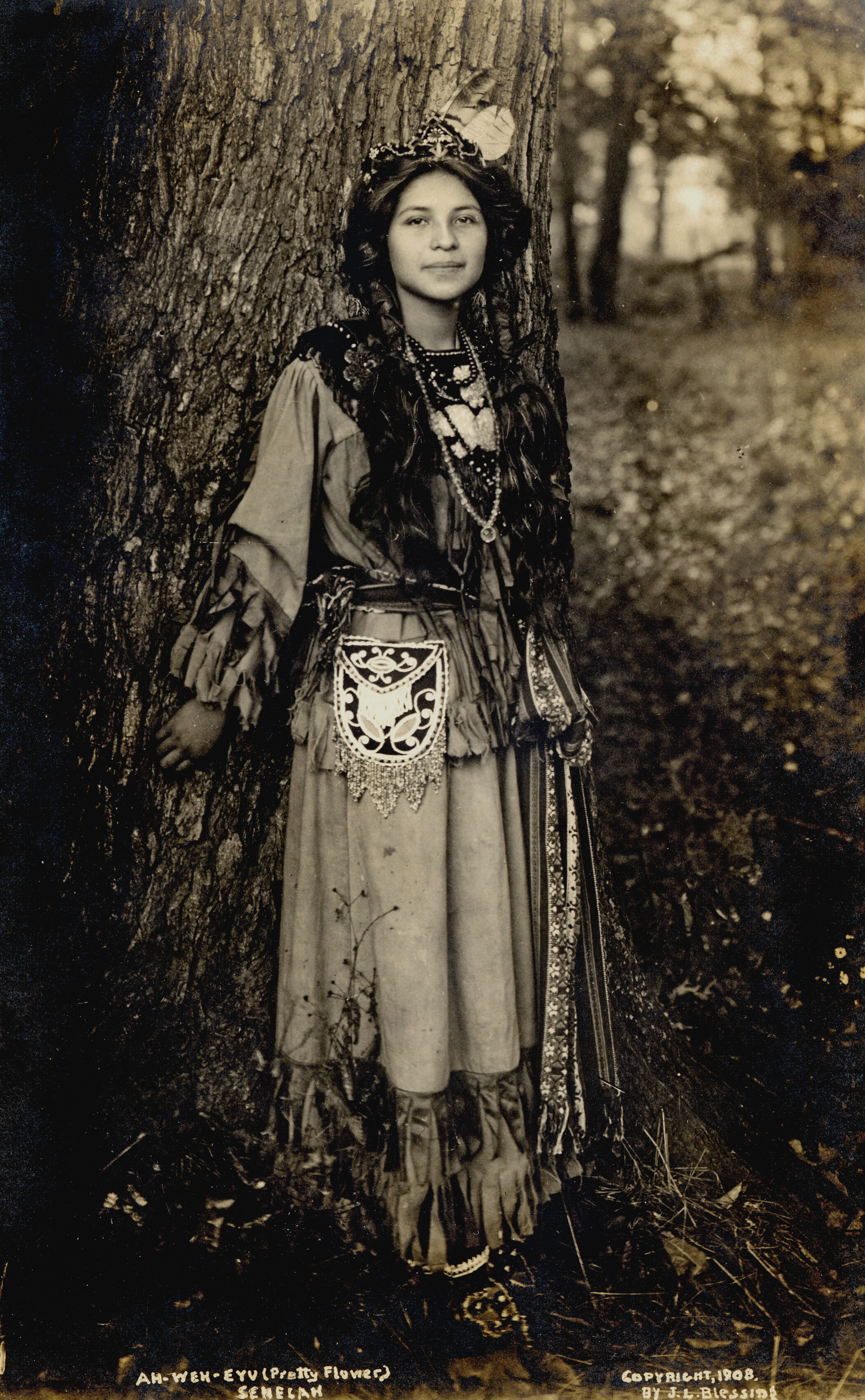
Seneca woman Ah-Weh-Eyu (Pretty Flower), 1908.

Prior to the American Revolution, the Seneca had a prosperous society. The Great Law of Peace had ended the fighting amongst the Haudenosaunee nations and allowed them to live in peace with each other. Yet, despite this peace amongst themselves, the Haudenosaunee nations were all revered as fierce warriors and were reputed to control together a large empire that stretched hundreds of miles along the Appalachian Mountains. The Seneca were a part of this confederacy with the Cayuga, Onondagas, Oneidas, Mohawks, and, later on, the Tuscaroras. However, although the Seneca and other Haudenosaunee nations had ceased fighting each other, they still continued to conduct raids on outsiders, or rather their European visitors.

Despite the Haudenosaunee continuing raids on their new European neighbors, the constituent Haudenosaunee nations struck up profitable relationships with the Europeans, especially the English. In 1677, the English were able to make an alliance with the League called the "Covenant Chain". In 1768, the English renewed this alliance when Sir William Johnson, 1st Baronet signed the Treaty of Fort Stanwix in 1768. This treaty put the British in good favor with the Haudenosaunee, as they felt that the British had their best interests in mind as well. The Americans, unlike the British, were disliked by the Seneca because of their continual disregard for the Treaty of Fort Stanwix. Specifically, the Haudenosaunee were enraged by the Americans movement into the Ohio Territory. However, despite their continual encroachment on established Haudenosaunee land, the Americans respected their skills at warfare and attempted to exclude them from their conflict with the British. The Americans viewed their conflict with the British as a conflict meant to include only them. The Albany Council occurred in August, and the Haudenosaunee Confederacy debated about the Revolution from August 25 to August 31. The non-Haudenosaunee present at the council consisted of important figures like Philip Schuyler, Oliver Wolcott, Turbutt Francis, Volkert Douw, Samuel Kirkland, and James Dean. The Haudenosaunee at the council were representatives from all the nations, but the Mohawk, Oneidas, and Tuscaroras had the most representatives. The Haudenosaunee agreed with the Americans and decided at their Albany Council that they should remain as spectators to the conflict. A Mohawk Chief named Little Abraham declared that "the determination of the Six Nations not to take any part; but as it is a family affair, to sit still and see you fight it out". Thus, the Haudenosaunee chose to remain neutral for the time being. They felt it would be best to stand aside while the Colonists and the British battled. They did not wish to get caught up in this supposed "family quarrel between [them] and Old England".

Despite this neutrality, the anti-Native American rhetoric of the Americans pushed the Haudenosaunee over to the side of the British. The Americans put forth an extremely racist and divisive message. They viewed the Haudenosaunee and other Native Americans as savages and lesser people. An example of this rhetoric came in the Declaration of Independence: "the merciless Indian Savages, whose known rule of warfare, is an undistinguished destruction of all ages, sexes, and conditions." As a result of this terrible rhetoric, many Mohawk, Cayuga, Onondaga, and Seneca prepared to join the British. However, many Oneida and Tuscarora were able to be swayed by an American missionary, Samuel Kirkland. The constituent nations began to divide as the Revolution continued and, as a result, they extinguished the council fire that united the six Haudenosaunee nations, therefore ending the Haudenosaunee Confederacy. The Haudenosaunee ended their political unity during the most turbulent time in their history. Two powers in the midst of battle pulled them apart to gain their skill as warriors. This divided the Haudenosaunee and the nations chose sides based on preference.

In addition to the push of American bigoted rhetoric, the British also continued to attempt to sway the Haudenosaunee towards their side. One British attempt to sway the Haudenosaunee was described by two Seneca, Mary Jemison and Chainbreaker (Governor Blacksnake). They both described the grandeur of the lavish gifts that the British bestowed upon the Haudenosaunee. Chainbreaker's account held many details about the luxurious treatment that they received from the British: "[I]mmediately after arrival the officers came to see us to See what wanted for to Support the Indians with Provisions and with the flood of Rum. they are Some of the ... warriors made use of this intoxicating Drinks, there was several Barrel Delivered to us for us to Drinked for the white man told us to Drinked as much as we want of it all free gratus, and the goods if any of us wishes to get for our own use." Contingent to this generosity was the loyalty of the Haudenosaunee to the British. The Haudenosaunee debated whether to side with the British or not. An argument to remain neutral until further development came from Chainbreaker's uncle Cornplanter, but Joseph Brant twisted his recommendation to wait as a sign of cowardice. The British noticed that the Indian warriors were divided on the issue, so the British presented them with rum, bells, ostrich feathers, and a covenant belt. The Americans attempted a similar wine and dine method on the Tuscarora and Oneidas. In the end, the Mohawk, Onondaga, Cayuga, and Seneca sided with the British, and the Tuscarora and Oneida sided with the Americans. From this point on, the Haudenosaunee would have a serious role in the American Revolution. The war divided them and now they would be fighting against each other from 1777 till the end on opposite sides.

==== Involvement in the American Revolution ====
The Seneca chose to side with the British in the American Revolution. One of the earliest battles the Haudenosaunee were involved in occurred on August 6, 1777, in Oriskany During the Battle of Oriskany, Native Americans led a brutal attack against the rebel Americans where they "killed, wounded, or captured the majority of patriot soldiers". The Seneca Chainbreaker described the battle from the viewpoint of the victorious Indians: "as we approach to a firghting we had preparate to make one fire and Run amongst them we So, while we Doing it, feels no more to Kill the Beast, and killed most all, the americans army, only a few white man Escape from us ... there I have Seen the most Dead Bodies all it over that I neve Did see."

Author Ray Raphael made a connection between the Seneca warriors and Continental Army soldiers by noting that Chainbreaker "was not unlike" known Revolutionary veterans "Joseph Plumb Martin and James Collins and other white American [veterans] who could never finally resolve whether killing was right or wrong". As the war went on, many more brutal attacks and atrocities would be committed by both sides, notably the Sullivan Expedition, which devastated Haudenosaunee and Seneca lands.

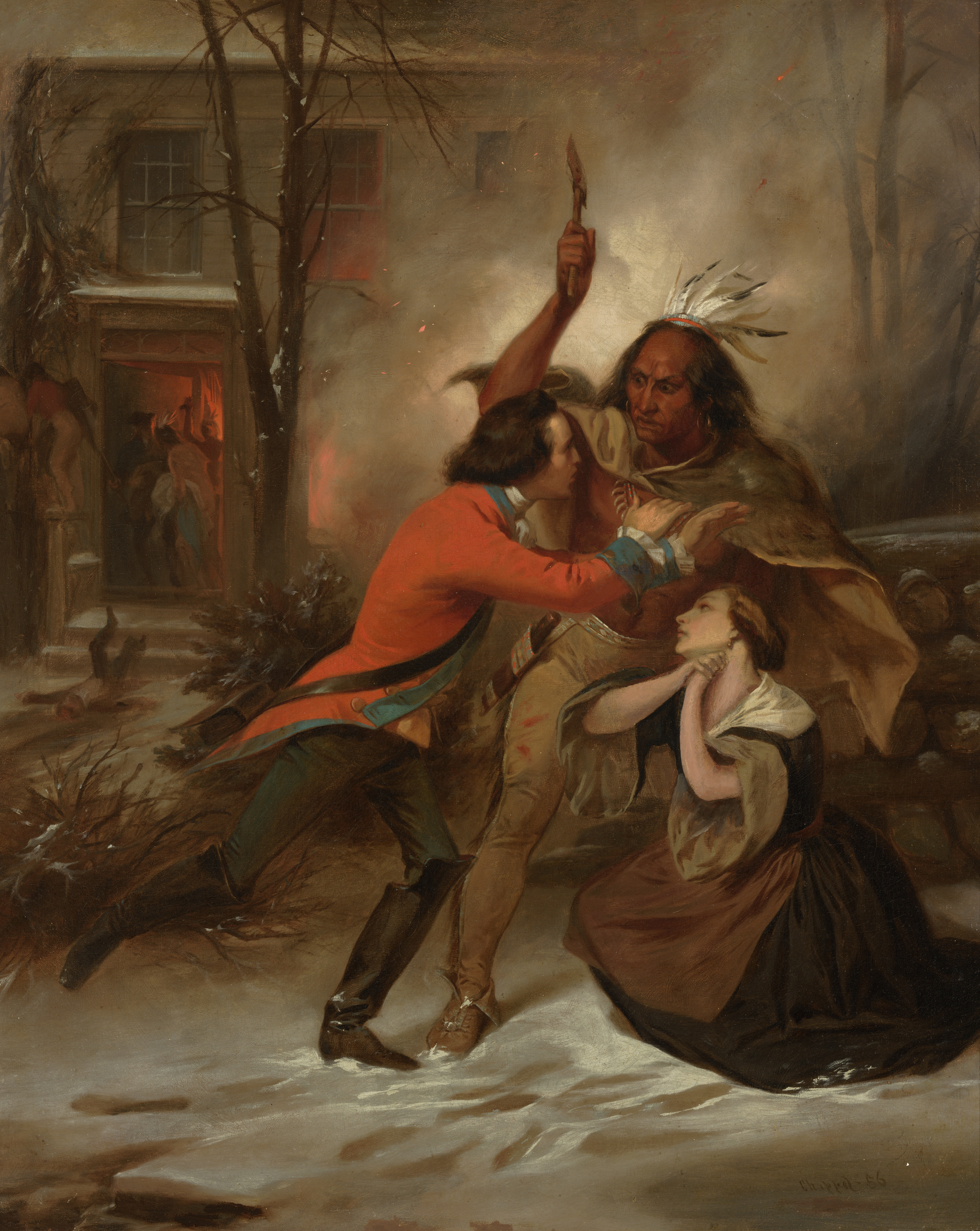
The Cherry Valley massacre, which the Seneca took part in

The Haudenosaunee were involved in numerous other battles during the American Revolution. Notable raids like the Cherry Valley massacre and Battle of Minisink, were carefully planned raids on a trail laid out "from the Susquehanna to the Delaware Valley and over the Pine Hill to the Esopus Country". In 1778 Seneca, Cayuga, Onondaga, and Mohawk warriors conducted raids on white settlements in the upper Susquehanna Valley. Although the Haudenosaunee were active participants, Seneca like Chainbreaker were extremely fed up with the brutality of the war. He noted particularly on his behavior at Oriskany, and how he felt "it was great sinfull by the sight of God".

Warriors like Chainbreaker were feeling the mental toll of killing so many people during the American Revolution. As Raphael noted in his book, "warfare had been much more personal" for the Haudenosaunee before the American Revolution. During the revolution, these once proud Haudenosaunee were now reduced to conducting brutal acts such as the killing of women and children at the Cherry Valley massacre and the clubbing of surviving American soldiers at Oriskany. Although Seneca like Chainbreaker felt sorrow for their brutal actions, the Americans responded in a colder and more brutal fashion. This retaliation came in the Sullivan Expedition.

The planning of the Sullivan Expedition began in 1778 as a way to respond to the Haudenosaunee victories and massacres. This plan came about from the complaints of New Yorkers at the Continental Congress. The New Yorkers had suffered from the Haudenosaunee offensives from 1777 to 1778, and they wanted revenge. Besides the brutal battles described previously, the New Yorkers were especially concerned with Joseph Brant. Joseph Brant had Mohawk parents and British lineage, and at a young age, he was taken under the superintendent for Indian affairs.

Brant grew to be a courteous and well-spoken man, and he took up the fight for the British because of harassment and discrimination from the Americans during the lead-up to the American Revolution. Thus, Brant formed a military group known as Brant's Volunteers, which consisted of Mohawks and Loyalists. Brant and his band of volunteers led many raids against hamlets and farms in New York, especially Tryon County. As a result of Brant's exploits, the Haudenosaunee offensives, and several massacres the Haudenosaunee inflicted against colonial towns, in 1778 the Seneca and other western nations were attacked by United States forces as part of the Sullivan Expedition. George Washington called upon Continental Army General John Sullivan (general) to lead this attack upon the Haudenosaunee. He had received anywhere from 3000 to 4500 soldiers to fight the Haudenosaunee.

Overall, the Sullivan Expedition wreaked untold havoc and destruction upon the Haudenosaunee lands, as the soldiers "destroy[ed] not only the homes of the Iroquois but their food stocks as well". Seneca woman Mary Jemison recalled how the Continental soldiers "destroyed every article of the food kind that they could lay their hands on". To make matters worse for the Haudenosaunee, an especially hard winter in 1780 caused additional suffering for the downtrodden Haudenosaunee. The Sullivan Expedition highlighted a period of true total war within the American Revolution. The Americans looked to cripple the Haudenosaunee. They accomplished that, but they instilled a deep hatred in the Haudenosaunee warriors.

After the Sullivan Expedition the recovered Seneca, Cayuga, Onondaga, and Mohawk, angered by the destruction caused, resumed their raids on American settlements in New York. These Haudenosaunee nations not only attacked and plundered the American colonists, they also set fire to Oneida and Tuscarora settlements. The Haudenosaunee continued their attacks upon the Americans, even after General Charles Cornwallis, 1st Marquess Cornwallis had surrendered at Yorktown in 1781. They did not stop until their allies had caved in and surrendered. In 1782, the Haudenosaunee had finally stopped fighting when the British General Frederick Haldimand recalled them "pending the peace the negotiations in Paris".

The Haudenosaunee also seemed to have a much larger knowledge of the war beyond the scope of New York. A letter from 1782 written by George Washington to John Hanson described intelligence captured from the British. In the letter, British soldiers encounter a group of Native Americans, and a discussion ensues. A soldier by the name of Campbell informs the Native Americans that the war ended and the Americans expressed their sorrow for the war. However, an unknown Seneca sachem informed the British "that the Americans and [F]rench had beat the English, that the latter could no longer carry on the War, and that the Indians knew it well, and must now be sacrificed or submit to the Americans".

==== After the American Revolution ====
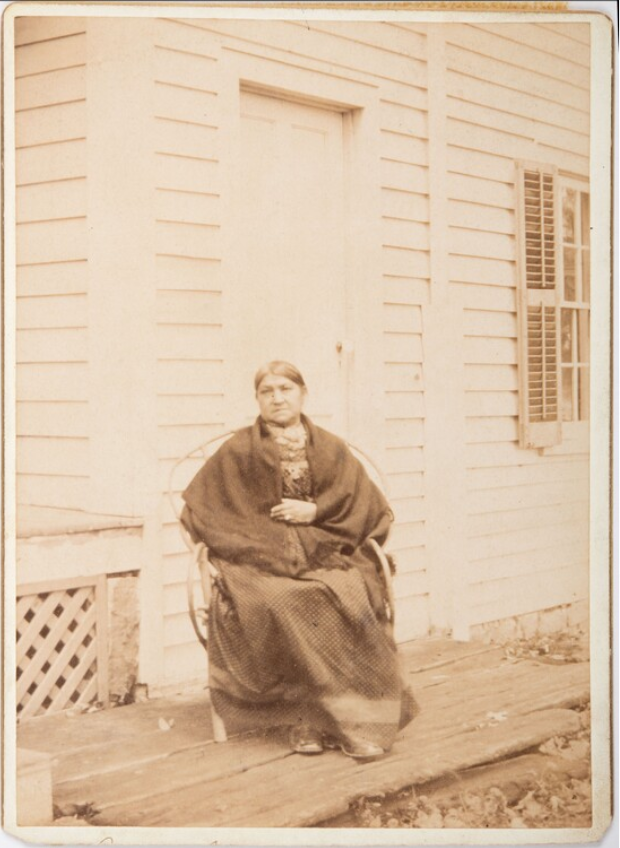
Caroline G. Parker (Jigonhsasee), Seneca activist and one of the signatories of the Haudenosaunee women's petition sent to President John Tyler to defend Indigenous lands.

With the Haudenosaunee League dissolved, the nation settled in new villages along Buffalo Creek, Tonawanda Creek, and Cattaraugus Creek in western New York. The Seneca, Onondaga, Cayuga, and Mohawk, as allies of the British, were required to cede all their lands in New York State at the end of the war, as Britain ceded its territory in the Thirteen Colonies to the new United States. The late-war Seneca settlements were assigned to them as their reservations after the Revolutionary War, as part of the Treaty of Fort Stanwix in 1784. Although the Oneida and Tuscarora were allies of the rebels, they were also forced to give up most of their territory.

On July 8, 1788, the Seneca (along with some Mohawk, Oneida, Onondaga, and Cayuga) sold rights to land east of the Genesee River in New York to Oliver Phelps and Nathaniel Gorham of Massachusetts.

On November 11, 1794, the Seneca (along with the other Haudenosaunee nations) signed the Treaty of Canandaigua with the United States, agreeing to peaceful relations. On September 15, 1797, at the Treaty of Big Tree, the Seneca sold their lands west of the Genesee River, retaining ten reservations for themselves. The sale opened up the rest of Western New York for settlement by European Americans. On January 15, 1838, the US and some Seneca leaders signed the Treaty of Buffalo Creek, by which the Seneca were to relocate to a tract of land west of the state of Missouri, but most refused to go.

The majority of the Seneca in New York formed a republican elected government, the Seneca Nation of Indians, in 1848. The Tonawanda Seneca Nation split off, choosing to keep a traditional form of government by condoled leaders. Both tribes are federally recognized in the United States.

During the nineteenth century, many Seneca adopted customs of their immediate American neighbors by building log cabins, practicing Christianity, and participating in the local agricultural economy.

== Seneca today ==
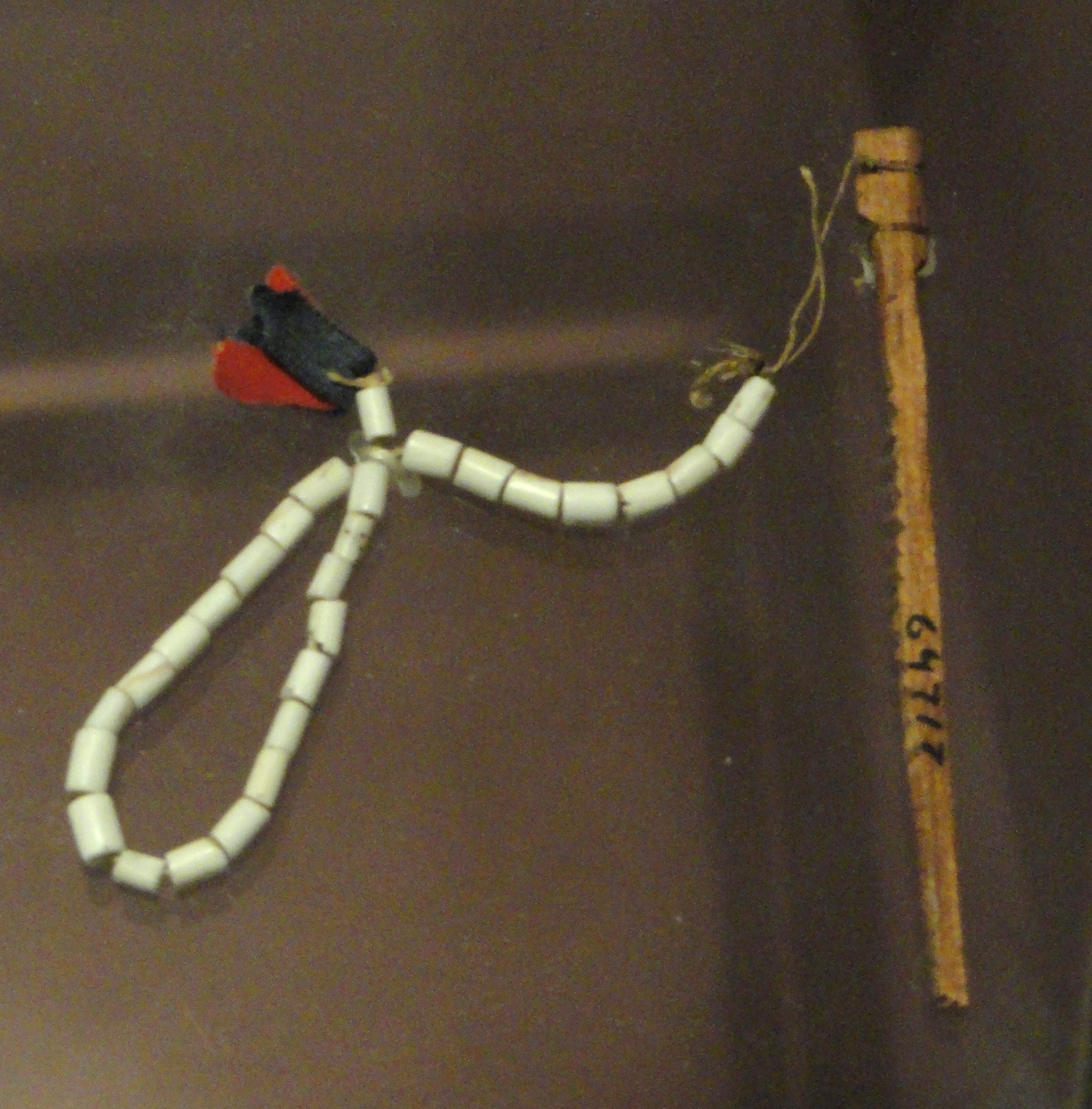
Seneca people message stick, inviting tribes to Six Nations dance, received in 1905. Exhibit from the Native American Collection, Peabody Museum, Harvard University, Cambridge, Massachusetts

While it is not known exactly how many Seneca there are, there are three federally recognized tribes in the United States, the Seneca Nation of Indians and the Tonawanda Seneca Nation in New York State and the Seneca-Cayuga Nation in Oklahoma. In Canada, Seneca reside at Six Nations in Ontario, where they are enrolled in the Konadaha Seneca First Nation and Niharondasa Seneca First Nation.

Approximately 10,000 Seneca live near Lake Erie. About 7,800 people are citizens of the Seneca Nation of Indians. These members live or work on five reservations in New York: the Allegany (which contains the city of Salamanca); the Cattaraugus near Gowanda, New York; the Buffalo Creek Territory located in downtown Buffalo; the Niagara Falls Territory located in Niagara Falls, New York; and the Oil Springs Reservation, near Cuba. Few Seneca reside at the Oil Springs, Buffalo Creek, or Niagara territories due to the small amount of land at each. The last two territories are held and used specifically for the gaming casinos which the Nation has developed.

The Tonawanda Seneca Nation has about 1,200 citizens who live on their Tonawanda Reservation near Akron, New York.

The third federally recognized tribe is the Seneca-Cayuga Nation who live near Miami, Oklahoma. They are descendants of Seneca and Cayuga who had migrated from New York into Ohio before the Revolutionary War, under pressure from European encroachment. They were removed to Indian Territory west of the Mississippi River in the 1830s.

Many Seneca and other Haudenosaunee migrated into Canada during and after the Revolutionary War, where the Crown gave them land in compensation for what was lost in their traditional territories. Some 10,000 to 25,000 Seneca are citizens of the Konadaha Seneca First Nation and Niharondasa Seneca First Nation at Six Nations of the Grand River, the major Haudenosaunee reserve near Brantford, Ontario..

Enrolled members of the Seneca Nation also live elsewhere in the United States; some moved to urban locations for work.

The Seneca language was rated "critically endangered" in 2007, with fewer than 50 fluent speakers, primarily the elderly. Efforts are currently underway to preserve and revitalize the language.

== Culture ==
=== Clans ===
The main form of Seneca social organization is the clan, or Kaʼsä:teʼ, nominally each descended from one woman. The Seneca have eight clans: Bear (Nygawaiʼ), Wolf (Agaʼta:yö:nih), Turtle (Ha'no:wa:h), Beaver (Nöganyaʼgöh), Deer (Neogë), Hawk (Gajiʼda:s), Snipe (Nödzahgwëʼ), and Heron (Jóäshäʼ). The clans are divided into two sides (moieties) – the Bear, Wolf, Turtle, and Beaver are the animal side, and the Deer, Hawk, Snipe, and Heron are the bird side.

The Seneca, like all Haudenosaunee, have a matrilineal kinship system; inheritance and property descend through the maternal line. Women are in charge of the clans. Children are considered born into their mother's clan and take their social status from her family. Their mother's eldest brother was traditionally more of a major figure in their lives than their biological father, who does not belong to their clan. The presiding elder of a clan is called the Clan Mother. Despite the prominent position of women in Haudenosaunee society, their influence on the diplomacy of the nation was limited. If the Clan Mothers do not agree with any major decisions made by the chiefs, they can eventually depose them.

The Seneca send eight chiefs to the Haudenosaunee Grand Council, where they are part of the Elder Brother moiety alongside the Mohawk people.

=== Traditional lifestyle ===
The traditional Seneca economy was based on hunting and gathering activities, fishing, and the cultivation of varieties of maize (onë́ö’), beans (osáe’da’), and squash (o:nyö́hsa’). These vegetables were the staple of the Haudenosaunee diet and were called "the three sisters" (Jöhéhgöh). Seneca women generally grew and harvested varieties of the three sisters, as well as gathering and processing medicinal plants, roots, berries, nuts, and fruit. Seneca women held sole ownership of all the land and the homes. The women also tended to any domesticated animals such as dogs (jiyä́’shö’öh) and turkeys (o’só:ön).

Seneca men were generally in charge of locating and developing the town sites, including clearing the forest for the production of fields. Seneca men also spent a great deal of time hunting and fishing. This activity took them away from the towns or villages to well-known and productive hunting and fishing grounds for extended amounts of time. These hunting and fishing locations were altered and well maintained to encourage game; they were not simply "wild" lands. Seneca men maintained the traditional title of war sachems within the Haudenosaunee. A Seneca war sachem was in charge of gathering the warriors and leading them into battle.

Seneca people lived in villages and towns. Archaeological excavations indicate that some of these villages were surrounded by palisades because of warfare. These towns were relocated every ten to twenty years as soil, game and other resources were depleted. The Seneca traditionally lived in longhouses (ganö́hse:s), which are large buildings that were up to 100 feet long and approximately 20 feet wide. The longhouses were shared among related families and could hold up to 60 people. Hearths were located in the central aisle, and two families shared a hearth.

=== Archery ===
Seneca warriors in London in 1818

Arrows from the area are made from split hickory, although shoots of dogwood (gahsi:sat) and Viburnum were used as well. The eastern two feather style of fletching was used, although three radial feathers were also used.

The Smithsonian Institution has an example of a Seneca bow, which was donated 1908. It is made of unbacked hickory, and is 56.25 inches (142.9 cm) tip to tip. Although the string is missing for the specimen, when strung it would make a good "D" shape with slightly recurved tips, and was obviously made for bigger game. The tips are irregular in shape, which is typical from this region.

== Land claims ==
=== Kinzua Dam displacement ===
The federal government through the Corps of Engineers undertook a major project of a dam for flood control on the Allegheny River. The proposed project was planned to affect a major portion of Seneca territory in Pennsylvania and New York. Begun in 1960, construction of the Kinzua Dam on the Allegheny River forced the relocation of approximately 600 Seneca from 10,000 acres (40 km^{2}) of land which they had occupied under the 1794 Treaty of Canandaigua. They were relocated to Salamanca, near the northern shore of the Allegheny Reservoir that resulted from the flooding of land behind the dam. The Seneca had protested the plan for the project, filing suit in court and appealing to President John F. Kennedy to halt construction.

The Seneca lost their court case, and in 1961, citing the immediate need for flood control, Kennedy denied their request. This violation of Seneca rights, as well as those of many other Indian Nations, was memorialized in the 1960s by folksinger Peter La Farge, who wrote, "As Long as the Grass Shall Grow". It was also sung by Bob Dylan and Johnny Cash.

=== Leased land disputes ===
The United States Senate has never ratified the treaty that New York made with the Haudenosaunee nations, and only Congress has the right to make such treaties. In the late 20th century, several tribes filed suit in land claims, seeking to regain their traditional lands by having the treaty declared invalid. The Seneca had other issues with New York and had challenged some long-term leases in court.

The dispute centers around a set of 99–year leases that were granted by the Seneca in 1890 for lands that are now in the city of Salamanca and nearby villages. In 1990, Congress passed the Seneca Settlement Act to resolve the long-running land dispute. The Act required the state to pay compensation and to provide some lands. The households that refused to accept Seneca ownership, fifteen in all, were evicted from their homes. Then, in the early 2000s issues re-arose over Seneca use of settlement lands to establish casino gaming operations, which have generated considerable revenues for many tribes since the late 20th century.

=== Grand Island claims ===
On August 25, 1993, the Seneca filed suit in United States District Court to begin an action to reclaim land allegedly taken from it by New York without having gained required approval of the treaty by the US Senate. Only the US government has the constitutional power to make treaties with the Native American nations. The lands consisted of Grand Island and several smaller islands in the Niagara River. In November 1993, the Tonawanda Band of Seneca Indians moved to join the claim as a plaintiff and was granted standing as a plaintiff.

In 1998, the United States intervened in the lawsuits on behalf of the plaintiffs in the claim to allow the claim to proceed against New York. The state had asserted that it was immune from suit under the Eleventh Amendment to the United States Constitution. After extensive negotiations and pre-trial procedures, all parties to the claim moved for judgment as a matter of law.

By decision and order dated June 21, 2002, the trial court held that the Seneca ceded the subject lands to Great Britain in the 1764 treaties of peace after the French and Indian War (Seven Years' War). Thus, the disputed lands were no longer owned by the Seneca at the time of the 1794 Treaty of Canandaigua. The court found that the state of New York's "purchase" of the lands from the Seneca in 1815 was intended to avoid conflict with them, but it already owned it by virtue of Great Britain's defeat in the Revolution and the cession of its lands to the United States and by default to the states in which the colonial lands were located.

The Seneca appealed the decision. The United States Court of Appeals for the Second Circuit affirmed the trial court's decision on September 9, 2004. The Seneca sought review of this decision by the US Supreme Court, which on June 5, 2006, announced that it declined to hear the case, which left the lower court rulings in place.

=== Thruway claims ===
On April 18, 2007, the Seneca Nation laid claim to a stretch of Interstate 90 that crosses the Cattaraugus Reservation for about three miles, in a section that runs on the northeast side of the lake from Erie, Pennsylvania to Buffalo, New York. They said that a 1954 agreement between the Seneca Nation and the New York State Thruway Authority, which granted the state permission to build the highway through their reservation in return for US$75,000, was invalid because it required federal approval. The lawsuit demands that some of the toll money collected by the Thruway Authority for the use of this three-mile stretch of the highway be remitted to the Nation. In 2011, Seneca President Robert Odawi Porter said that the Nation should be paid $1 every time a vehicle drives that part of the highway, amounting to tens of millions of dollars. The Nation also disputed the state's attempts to collect cigarette taxes and casino revenue from tribal businesses operating within Seneca sovereign territory. As of 2020, the lawsuit over the thruway was ongoing.

The Seneca had previously brought suit against the state on the issue of highway easements. The court in 1999 had ruled that the State could not be sued by the tribe. In Magistrate Heckman's "Report and Recommendation", it was noted that the State of New York asserted its immunity from suit against both counts of the complaint. One count was the Seneca Tribe's challenge regarding the state's acquisition of Grand Island and other smaller islands in the Niagara River, and the second count challenged the state's thruway easement.

== Notable Seneca ==
- Chief John Big Tree
- Cornplanter (Gayë́twageh) (c. 1730s–1836), military leader
- Jesse Cornplanter (Hayonhwonhish) (1889–1957), traditional artist
- Chainbreaker or Governor Blacksnake (Të꞉wö꞉nyaʼs)
- Destroy Town (Onondakai)
- Guyasuta (Gayáhso꞉dö’)
- Half-King (Tanacharison)
- Traynor Ora Halftown
- Handsome Lake (Sganyodaiyoʼ) (1735–1815), religious leader
- George Heron (Hah Seh Nogwas)
- Alice Lee Jemison, journalist and activist
- Mary Jemison (Deh-he-wä-nis)
- Little Beard (Si-gwa-ah-doh-gwih)
- John Mohawk (Sotsisowah)
- John Arthur Gibson (Sganyodaiyoʼ), Seneca Hoyaneh
- Catherine Montour
- Arthur C. Parker (Ga:wasowa:nëh), anthropologist and author
- Ely S. Parker (Dó:nihogä́:'wëh)
- Maris Bryant Pierce (Ha-dya-no-doh, Swift Runner) (1811–1874), lawyer, land-rights activist, interpreter
- Sanford Plummer (Ga-yo-gwa-doke), artist and author
- Red Jacket (Shagóye:wa:taʼ) (c. 1750–1830), leader and orator
- Sayenqueraghta or Kaieñãkwaahtoñ (c. 1707 – 1786), known as "Old King"
- Young King (Koyengquahtah)
- Phyllis Bardeau (Gayanögwad) (1934–2023), author and Seneca Language educator.
- Caroline G. Parker (Jigöhsahsë) (1826–1892) intellectual, activist and embroiderer

== See also ==
- Gaasyendietha
- Lewis H. Morgan
- Seneca mission
- Seneca mythology
- Seneca Rocks
