= Six Nations of the Grand River =

First Nations reserve in Ontario, Canada

Six Nations 40
- Indian reserve
- Six Nations Indian Reserve No. 40
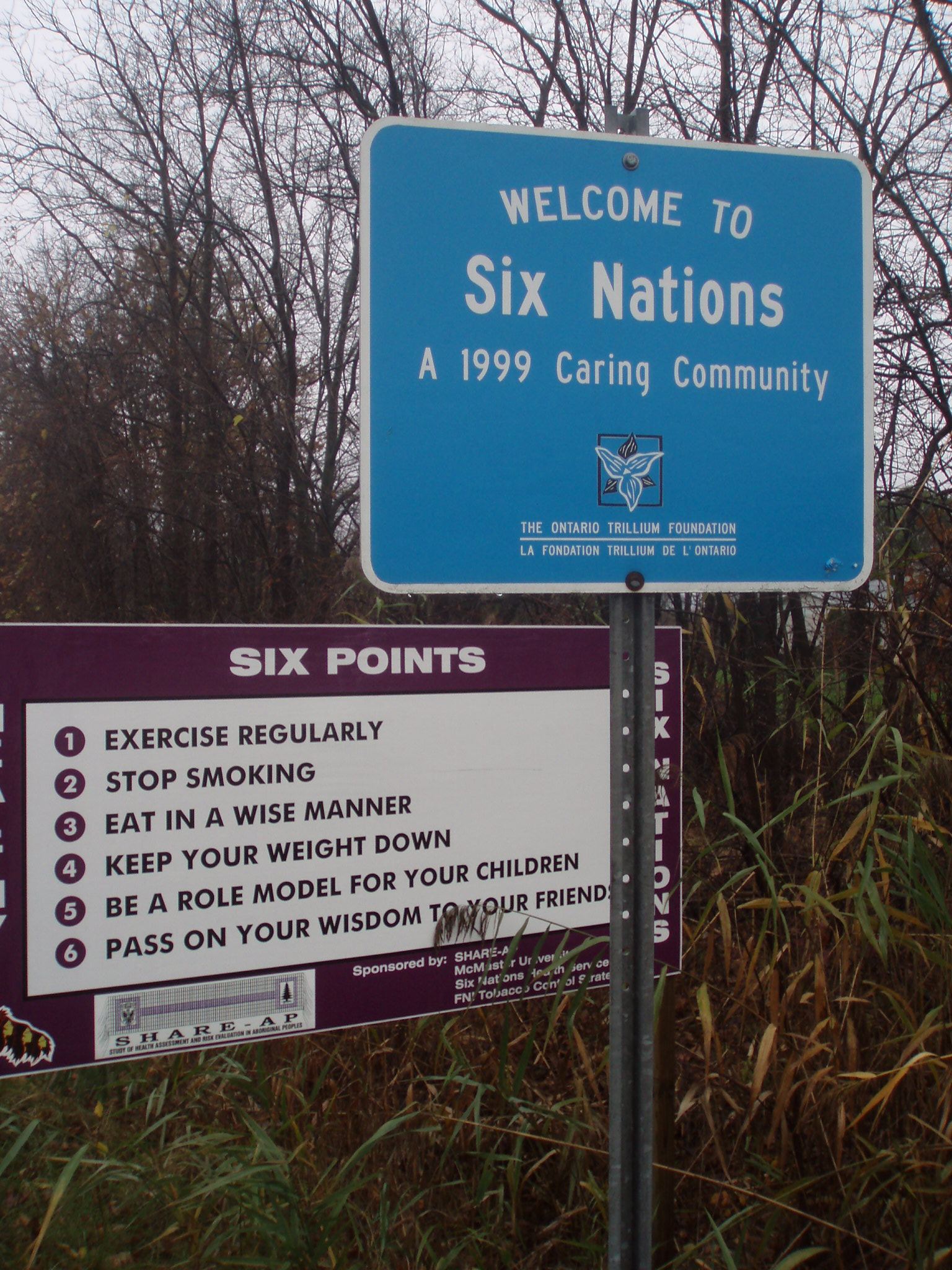

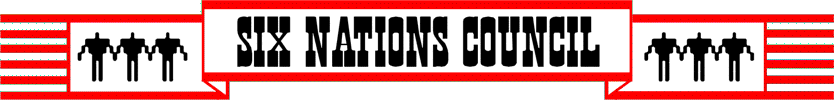
- Logo of the Elected Council

- Location within Southern Ontario
- Coordinates: 43°03′04″N 80°07′21″W
- Country: Canada
- Province: Ontario
- County: Brant
- Formed: 1924

Government
  - Body: Six Nations of the Grand River Elected Council
  - Chief: Sherri-Lyn Hill
  - Federal riding: Brantford—Brant South—Six Nations
  - Prov. riding: Brantford—Brant

Area
  - Land: 183.20 km^{2} (70.73 sq mi)

Population (end of 2017)
  - Total: 12,848
- Time zone: UTC-5 (EST)
  - Summer (DST): UTC-4 (EDT)
- Postal Code: N0A
- Area codes: 519 and 226
- Website: www.sixnations.ca

Six Nations (or Six Nations of the Grand River) (Note: Other than English and French, the two official languages of Canada, Indigenous languages of each of the six nations are also officially recognized and promoted: French: Réserve des Six Nations (de la rivière Grand); Mohawk: Yá:yaʼk Niyononhwentsyò:ten (ne Kenhionhata:tie Ó:se); Oneida: Yá·yaˀk Nihonuhutsa·ké; Onondaga: Dyehashędákhwaʼ; Cayuga: Hyeí Niyǫhwęjá:ge: or Hyeí Ni̠honǫ̱hwę́ja̱ˀgeh; Seneca: Ye:i’ Níónöëdzage:h or Swe:gë’; Tuscarora: Swekęˀá·ka·ˀ) is a First Nations reserve in Canada. As of the end of 2017, it had a total of 27,276 members, 12,848 of whom live on the reserve, making it the most populous reserve in the country. The six nations of the Haudenosaunee Confederacy are the Mohawk, Cayuga, Onondaga, Oneida, Seneca and Tuscarora. Some Lenape (also known as Delaware) live in the territory as well.

The Six Nations reserve is bordered by the County of Brant, Norfolk County, and Haldimand County, with a subsection reservation, the New Credit Reserve, located within its boundaries. The acreage at present covers some 46,000 acres (190 km^{2}) near the city of Brantford, Ontario. This represents approximately 8% of the original 550,000 acres (2,200 km^{2}) of land granted to the Six Nations by the 1784 Haldimand Proclamation.

== History ==
On-reserve population
Year	Pop.	±%
1784	1,843	—
1847	2,200	+19.4%
1858	2,421	+10.0%
1915	4,700	+94.1%
1956	5,850	+24.5%
1994	7,000	+19.7%
2013	12,271	+75.3%
2017	12,848	+4.7%

Many of the Haudenosaunee people allied with the British during the American Revolutionary War, particularly warriors from the Mohawk, Cayuga, Onondaga and Seneca nations. Some warriors of the Oneida and Tuscarora also allied with them, as warfare was highly decentralized. These nations had longstanding trade relations with the British and hoped they might stop European-American encroachment on their territories. These allies were from the Six Nations of the Haudenosaunee (Iroquois) Confederacy.

After the American victory in the conflict, the Crown ceded all of its territory in the colonies to their new government under a peace treaty, including that belonging to the Six Nations without consulting them or making them party to treaty negotiations. The Crown worked to resettle native Loyalists in Canada and provide some compensation for lands lost in the new United States. The Crown also hoped to use these new settlers, both Native Americans and European Americans, to develop agriculture and towns in areas west of Quebec, the territory later known as Upper Canada.

The new lands granted to Six Nations reserves were all near important Canadian military targets and placed along the border to prevent any American invasion. The growth of the Six Nations community was also hampered. Land, especially in the 17th and 18th centuries, granted a certain measure of power to their owners. Influential leaders such as Joseph Brant and John Deseronto were prevented from granting land to business owners who could have brought industry and agriculture to their lands.

After the war, Mohawk leaders Deseronto and Brant met with British commander Sir Frederick Haldimand to discuss the loss of their lands in New York. Haldimand promised to resettle the Mohawk near the Bay of Quinte, on the northeast shore of Lake Ontario, in present-day Ontario, Canada. Haldimand purchased from other First Nations a tract 12 mi (19 km) by 13 mi (21 km) on the Bay of Quinte, which he granted to the Mohawk. (There are of course questions about First Nations understanding of such purchase). About 200 Mohawk settled with Deseronto on the bay, at what is now called the Tyendinaga Mohawk Territory, Ontario. Deseronto later died in the town named after him in the territory. These were primarily Mohawk of the Lower Castle (of New York).

=== Six Nations at Grand River ===
Brant decided that he preferred to settle on the Grand River north of Lake Erie. Mohawk of the Upper Castle joined him in settling on the Grand River, as did bands of the other Six Nations. By the Haldimand Proclamation of October 25, 1784, the government granted a tract of land to the Mohawk and other Six Nations bands in appreciation of their support for the Crown during the revolution. The Crown had purchased the lands previously from the Mississauga on May 22, 1784, as part of the Between the Lakes Treaty. Joseph Brant led a large group of Haudenosaunee to settle in what is now referred to as the Six Nations of the Grand River.

A 1785 census recorded 1,843 Natives living on the Grand River reserve, including 548 Mohawk, 281 Cayuga, 145 Onondaga, 262 Oneida, 109 Tuscarora, and 98 Seneca. There were also 400 persons from other tribes, including Lenape, and others from southern territory, such as the Nanticoke, Tutelo, and some Creek and Cherokee. African-American slaves were also brought to Six Nations and Brantford by Brant. He encouraged members of his family to marry local Blacks, absorbing them into the population on the reserve. From the 1830s to the 1860s many runaway slaves, escaping through the Underground Railroad, were received and absorbed into the population of Six Nations. Along with the African-Americans who settled largely in the area around Cainsville, Brant invited several Anglo-American white families to live on the grant, particularly veterans of Brant's Volunteers and Butler's Rangers from New York, who had fought with him during the war. To encourage his loyalist friends to settle there, Brant gave them larger grants than the government had given other loyalists in other areas of Upper Canada. Some Canadians objected to Brant giving such land grants to whites in the reserve area.

As the government did for European Americans, the Indian department provided the Haudenosaunee with some tools and other provisions for resettlement, including such items as saws, axes, grindstones, and chisels. They received help in establishing schools and churches, and in acquiring farm equipment and other necessities. Conditions were extremely difficult in the first years on the frontier, as the government did not provide enough supplies or assistance to any of the resettled loyalists, neither Native Americans nor European Americans. They had to create new settlements out of woodlands. In 1785, the government built the first Protestant church in Upper Canada (now Ontario) on the reserve; it was known as Her Majesty's Royal Chapel of the Mohawks. The Crown maintained its support of this chapel, and it is among only twelve Chapels Royal in the world.

The main town developed at what is now Brantford. It was first called Brant's Town after Joseph Brant, who built his residence there. In 1798, it was described as a large and sprawling settlement. Brant's home was a two-story house, built in a European-American style. In 1797, Brant founded one of the earliest Masonic Lodges in Upper Canada; he achieved the rank of its Worshipful Master.

Governor John Simcoe confirmed the grant with a limited deed on January 14, 1793. The deed also forbade them to sell the land to anyone but each other and the king. Led by Joseph Brant, the chiefs rejected the deed. In 1795, the Grand River chiefs empowered Joseph Brant to sell large blocks of land in the northern section, which the Haudenosaunee were not using at the time. They set terms of no money down because they wanted to take their payment entirely in future years as annual interest. At this time, the population on the reserve was declining; some Haudenosaunee left the Grand River for traditional native communities in New York. After Brant's land sales started in 1795, the population began to increase again. He and the chiefs insisted on annuities to help the Six Nations community survive.

According to the Haldimand Proclamation, the original tract of land stretched from the mouth of the Grand River on the shores of Lake Erie to the river's head, and for 10 km (6 mi) from either bank. However, the grant of land included land around the source that the Crown had not purchased from the Mississauga. A purchase from the Mississauga was later arranged, but not carried out. Between 1795 and 1797, Joseph Brant sold 381,480 acres (1,543.8 km^{2}) to land speculators; the property comprising the northern half of the reserve was sold for £85,332. This was the highest price paid to Haudenosaunee up to this time for undeveloped land.

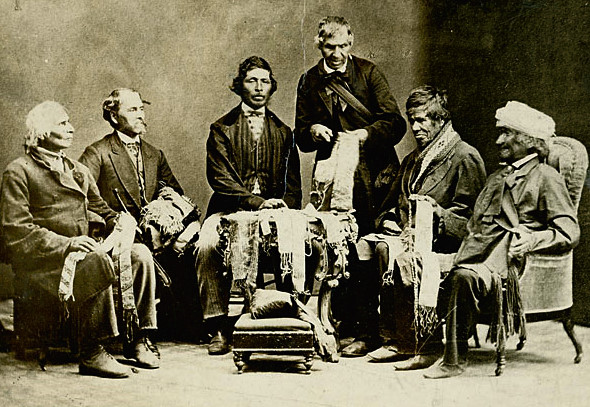
Chiefs of the Six Nations explaining their wampum belts to Horatio Hale, 1871

Governor Simcoe opposed the land sales. The interest on the annuity promised an income to the people of £5,119 per year, far more than any other Haudenosaunee people had received. The land speculators were unable to sell farm-size lots to settlers fast enough. By 1801, however, all the land speculators had fallen behind in their payments. Because of the lack of payments, Brant was determined to sell more land to make up for the missing payments.

In 1796, Lord Dorchester issued another deed for the land. This empowered the Haudenosaunee to lease or sell their land, provided they offered it first for sale to the government. Brant rejected this deed, partly because the deed named the Six Nations as communal owners of the land. He believed the deed should be limited to the current persons living on the land.

By 1800, two-thirds of the Haudenosaunee had not yet adapted to the style of subsistence agriculture maintained by separate households that the Canadian government encouraged. Brant had hoped that sales of land to European Americans would help them develop the frontier, but conditions were difficult for such agriculture.

In 1813, the chiefs and councillors of the Six Nations residing in the state of New York would declare war on the provinces of Upper and Lower Canada.

In 1828, chief John Brant was appointed resident superintendent for the Six Nations of the Grand River.

The Six Nations people were originally deeded 10 km (6 miles) on either side of the entire length of the Grand River, although much of the land was later sold. The ongoing Grand River land dispute is the result of disputes over the sale process. The current reserves encompass 184.7 square kilometres (71.3 mi^{2}), all but 0.4 square kilometres (99 acres) in Six Nations reserve No. 40.

In the late 19th century, the Scottish doctor Joseph Bell excavated skulls of Indigenous people in the Six Nations. These skulls reached Berlin, Germany through the mediation of the doctor William Osler, where they were considered untraceable for decades. In 2020, the journalists David Bruser and Markus Grill, supported by the ethnologist Nils Seethaler, succeeded in finding the skulls in the anatomical collection of the Berlin Society for Anthropology, Ethnology and Prehistory. A return of the skulls to the care of the community of origin was suggested in this context.

On July 24, 2024, ice hockey player Brandon Montour became the first person to bring the Stanley Cup to Ohsweken after the Florida Panthers won their first championship following their series win over the Edmonton Oilers in game seven of the 2024 Stanley Cup Final. A parade was held in his honour that went from the Ohsweken Speedway to the Gaylord Powless Arena.

The community is part owner of a large grid battery in Hagerville, and plans two other batteries.

== Members ==
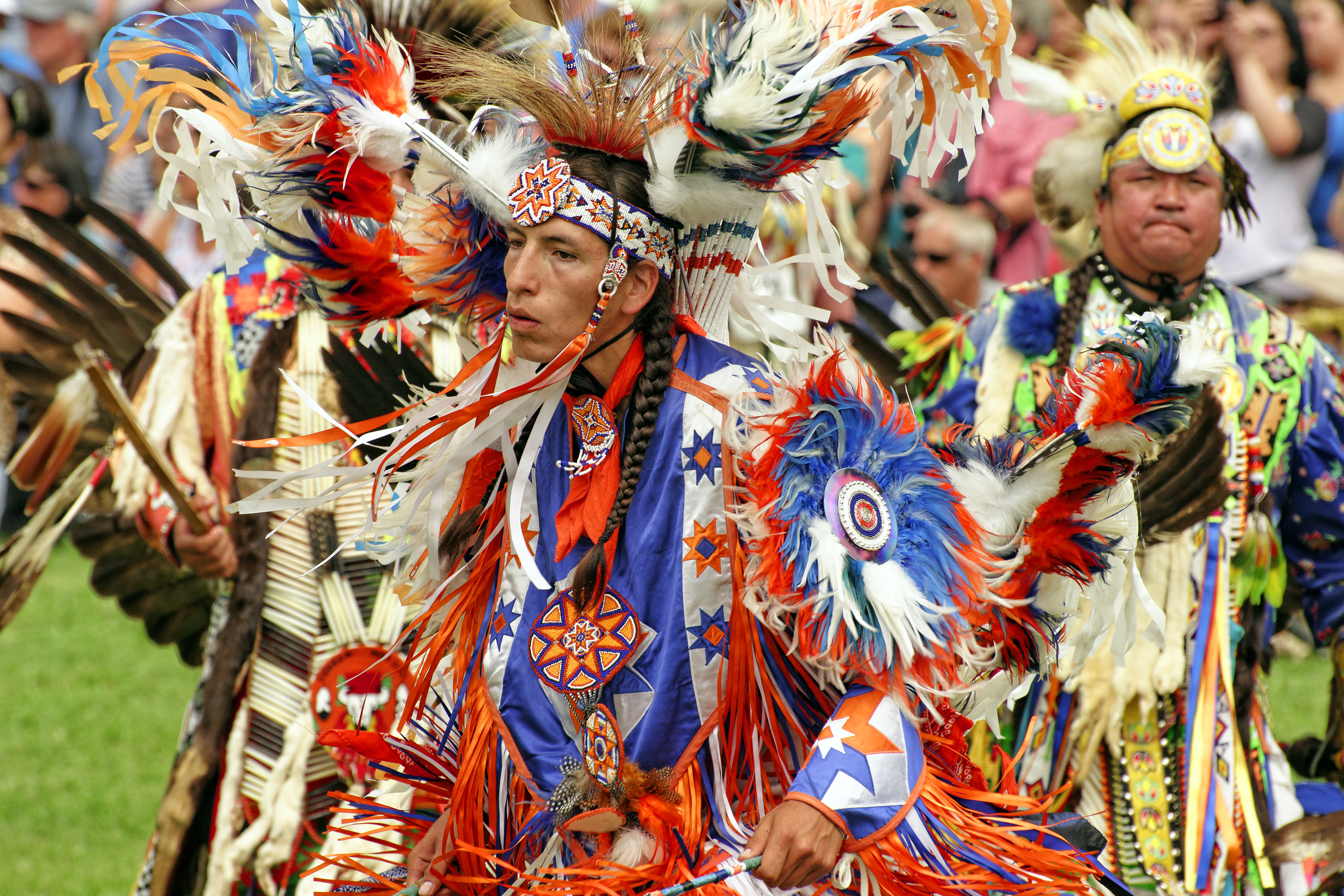
Dancers at the Six Nations Pow Wow

Six Nations of the Grand River is the most populous reserve in Canada. As of March 2023, there were 28,520 band members, of whom 11,688 lived on the reserve. The population consists of the following bands:

Nation	Band name	Total	On reserve
Haudenosaunee	Bay of Quinte Mohawk	840	368
Haudenosaunee	Lower Towns Tuscarora	2,430	974
Haudenosaunee	Konadaha Seneca	621	207
Haudenosaunee	Niharondasa Seneca	434	177
Haudenosaunee	Lower Mohawk	4,456	2,152
Haudenosaunee	Walker Mohawk	521	318
Haudenosaunee	Upper Mohawk	6,802	2,964
Haudenosaunee	Lower Cayuga	3,881	1,407
Haudenosaunee	Upper Cayuga	3,996	1,522
Haudenosaunee	Bearfoot Onondaga	690	150
Haudenosaunee	Clear Sky Onondaga	876	452
Haudenosaunee	Oneida	2,226	771
Lenape	Delaware of Six Nations	747	226
Total		28,520	11,688

== Communities ==
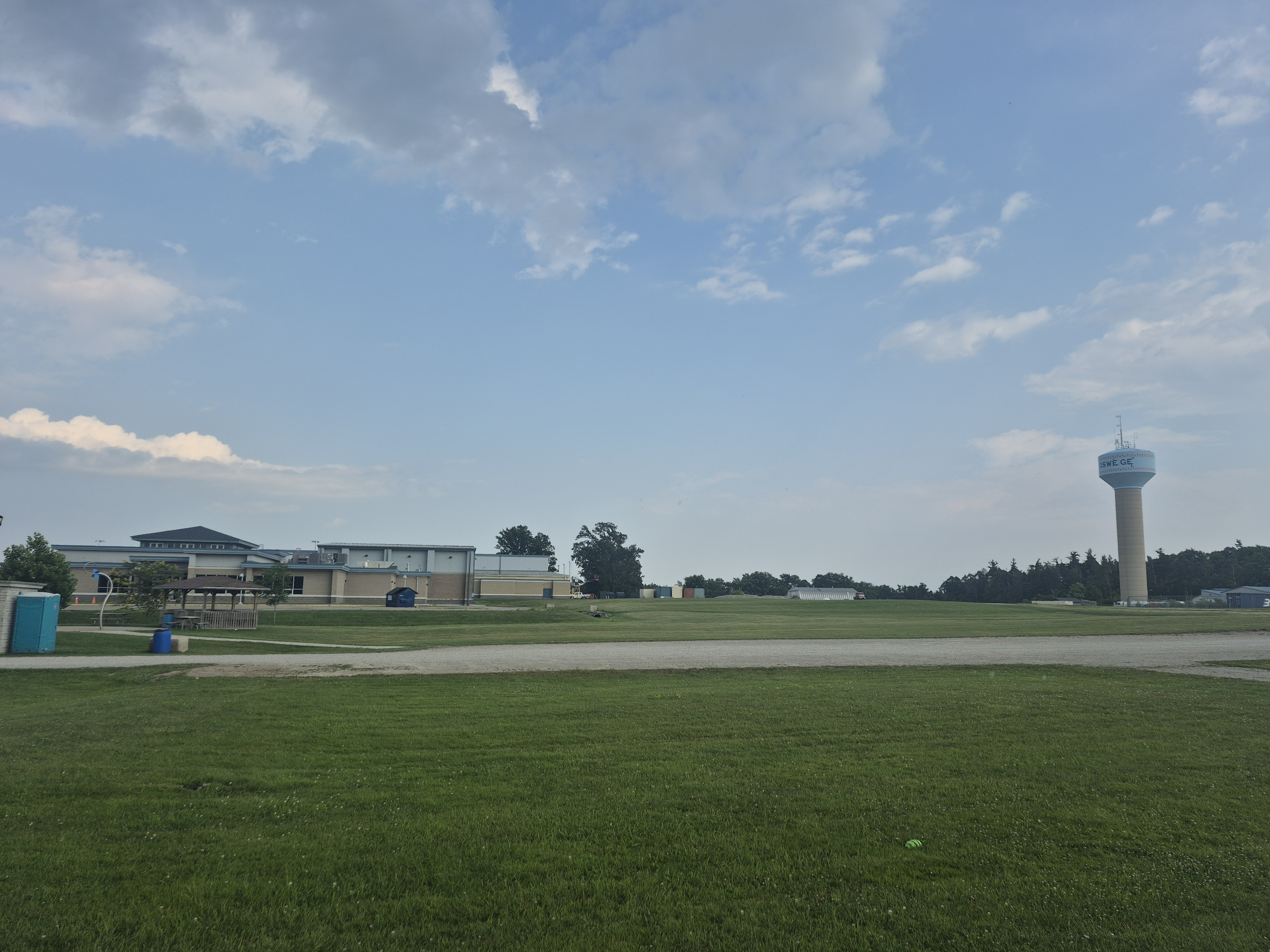
Water tower and running tracks outside of the arena in Ohsweken.

Several named communities exist within the Six Nations reserve:

- Beavers Corner
- Longboat Corners
- Medina Corners
- Millers Corner
- Ohsweken
- St. Johns
- Sixty-Nine Corners
- Smith Corners
- Smoothtown
- Sour Spring
- Stoneridge

== Government ==
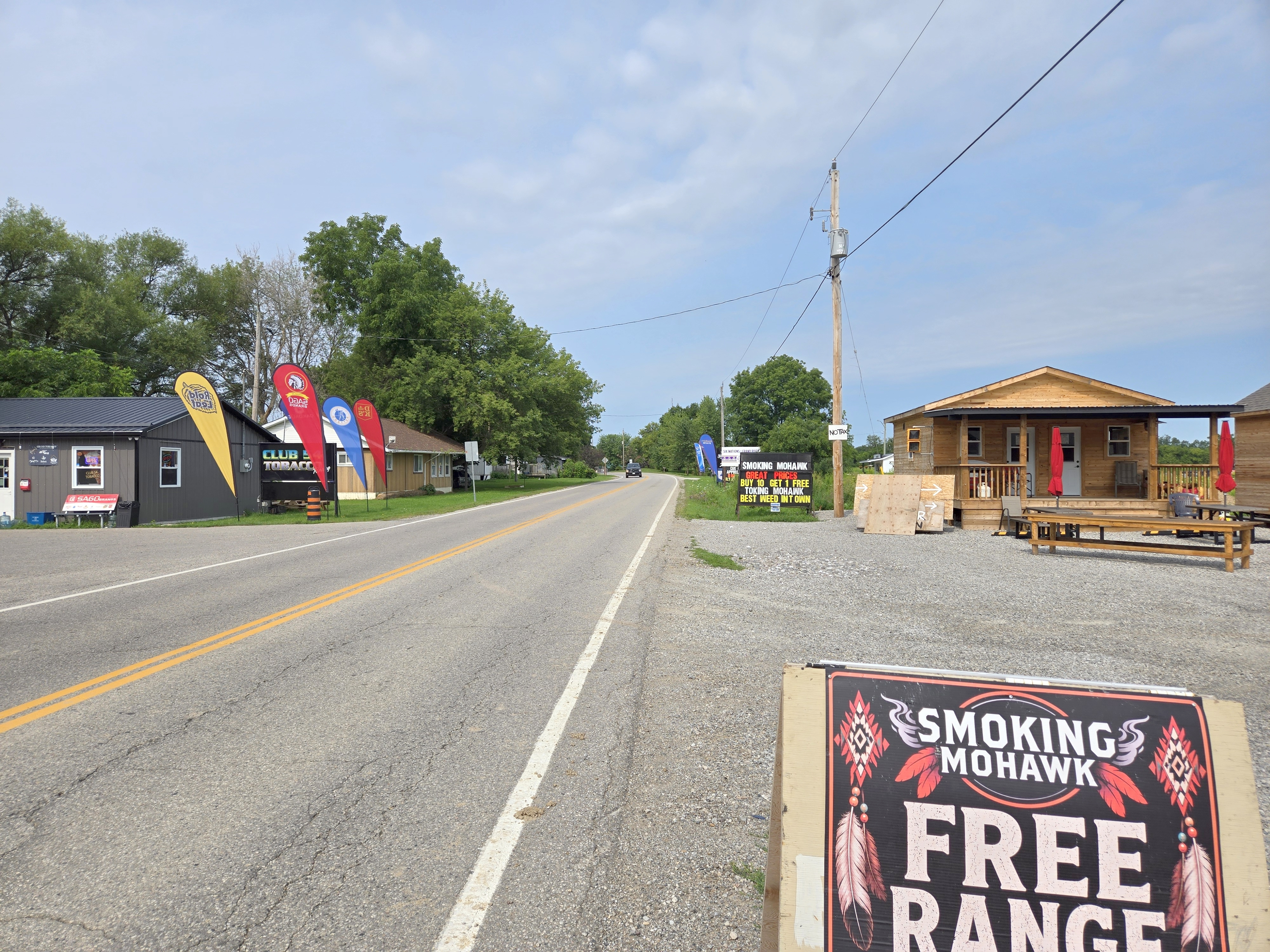
Tobacco and cannabis shops on Highway 54 west of Middleport

The Six Nations of the Grand River Elected Council is a governing body established to run the affairs of the reserve in 1924, formed under the Indian Act. The Elected Council has, since its foundation, been the primary government of Six Nations recognised by the Government of Canada. However, the Haudenosaunee Confederacy Chiefs Council has maintained a presence on the reserve despite the establishment of the elected council, representing a continuity with the traditional government of the Haudenosaunee Confederacy.

== Education ==
Prior to colonization, education in Haudenosaunee communities took place in "unstructured and non-coercive ways." This continues to this day alongside provincial education.

Members of the Six Nations attended the Mohawk Institute, a residential school which was the subject of numerous abuse allegations. Upon closure of the institute in 1972, the residential school was replaced by the Woodland Cultural Centre.

Day schools were also operated on the reserve under the Six Nations School Board (1878–1933), the first Indigenous school board in Ontario. While the official colonial curriculum was taught and many non-Indigenous teachers taught on the reserve, Indigenous influence on the board allowed for the hiring of many Six Nations teachers, many of them women - as was and continues to be the case at the elementary level in Ontario. Teachers on the reserve also formed their own association for professional development, the Six Nations Teacher's Organization.

== See also ==
- Bell Homestead National Historic Site
- List of townships in Ontario
- Six Nations Polytechnic
- Oneida Indian Nation
- Oneida Nation of the Thames
- Oneida Nation of Wisconsin
