= Upper Mohawk First Nation =

The Upper Mohawk First Nation is a Mohawk band based in southern Ontario and is a member nation of the Six Nations of the Grand River. Members of the Upper Mohawk share the territory of Six Nations and is governed under their council.
