= List of people from Lewiston, New York =

A list of people who are from or have lived in Lewiston, New York (including: The Village of Lewiston, Lewiston Heights, the Tuscarora Reservation, Pekin, and Colonial Village). Individuals are listed in alphabetical order by last name in each category.

== Artists ==
- Jacob Kassay, painter

== Authors ==
- James Fenimore Cooper, American writer who stayed during the summer of 1821
- Catherine Gildiner, who wrote the best-selling memoir Too Close to the Falls
- Herbert Richardson, publisher and founder of The Edwin Mellen Press

== Bands, composers, musicians and entertainers ==
- Tim Easton, guitarist, singer-songwriter
- Dick Smothers, half of the Smothers Brothers music and comedy duo (relocated to Lewiston after retirement)

== Business and industry ==
- Benjamin Barton, businessman and builder of the Frontier House
- Samuel Barton, businessman and builder of the Frontier House
- Frank A. Dudley, former lawyer, politician, hotelier and business owner
- William Morgan, New York businessman and author on Freemasonry
- Paul A. Schoellkopf, industrialist and chairman of the Buffalo Niagara Electric Corporation

== Military ==
- Joseph Brant, Mohawk military and political leader

== Politics and law ==
- John Ceretto, New York state assemblyman
- Bates Cooke, member United States House of Representatives and later New York State Comptroller
- John B. Daly, politician
- Noah Davis, politician
- Francine DelMonte, former New York State Assemblywoman
- Clinton Rickard, Tuscarora chief
- Stefano Magaddino, mafia boss
- James S. Simmons, politician
- Horatio J. Stow, politician
- Sheldon Thompson, former mayor of Buffalo, New York

== Religion, charities, social advocacy ==
- Wallace "Mad Bear" Anderson, Native American activist
- John Napoleon Brinton Hewitt, notable linguist
- Barney E. Warren, Christian hymnwriter and minister

== Sports ==
- Jack Armstrong, TV analyst and announcer for the Toronto Raptors
- Mike Bell, Major League Baseball player
- Kyle Cerminara, former US Olympic wrestler
- Rick Dudley, professional hockey player and coach
- Daryl Johnston, fullback for the Dallas Cowboys
- Patti Lank, curler
- Robert Lindley Murray, chemist and tennis player
- Vince Molyneaux, Major League Baseball player
- Earl Seick, former professional football player
