= Tuscarora Nation =

Indigenous nation in New York, United States

Skarù·ręˀ Kayedá·kreh

Total population
- 1,152

Regions with significant populations
- United States ( (New York (state)) New York)

Languages
- English, Tuscarora

Religion
- Longhouse religion, Christianity

Related ethnic groups
- Tuscarora First Nation, Haudenosaunee people, other Iroquoian peoples

The Tuscarora Nation (Tuscarora: Skarù·ręˀ Kayedá·kreh), previously named the Tuscarora Nation of New York, is a federally recognized tribe of Tuscarora people. The tribe's headquarters is located on the Tuscarora Reservation in Lewiston, New York, and their elected chief is Tom Jonathan.

== History ==
=== Precontact to 18th century ===
The Tuscarora had migrated in ancient times from the New York area to the Carolinas. After an extended conflict with European settlers and other Native Americans at the beginning of the 18th century led to their defeat in the Tuscarora War, most of the Tuscarora migrated north to Haudenosaunee territory, beginning in 1722. The Tuscarora first settled in the territory of the Oneida people in central New York. By 1765, they declared their nation fully relocated and said that remnant Tuscarora who stayed in the south would no longer be considered part of the nation.

=== 19th century ===
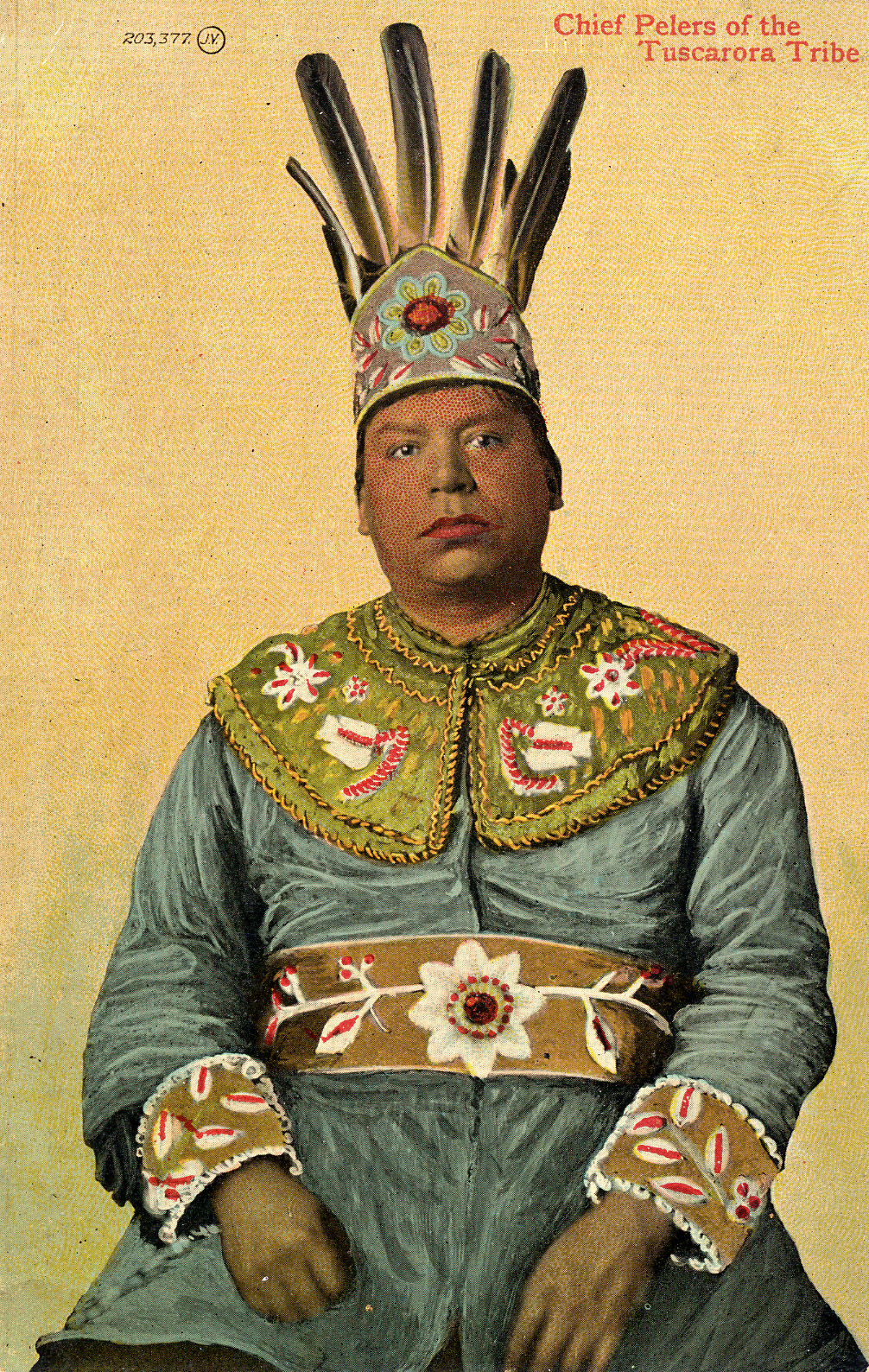
Casper Peters, Tuscarora Tribe

The Tuscarora and Oneida became allies of the American Continental cause during the American Revolution, and of the United States during the War of 1812. During both wars, they suffered attacks by British armed forces and their Indigenous allies in central New York. In 1797 Tuscarora were given land from the Seneca people (territory which the Seneca had taken from the Neutral Nation in the Beaver Wars of the mid-17th century). In 1803, the US government granted the Tuscarora a reservation in Niagara County.

During the War of 1812, British forces attacked Lewiston, New York on December 19, 1813. A band of Tuscarora living in a village on an escarpment just above the town assisted the town's residents as they fled the attacking force. The British force was accompanied by Mohawk warrior and some white colonists disguised as Mohawks. The American militia fled, leaving only the Tuscarora—outnumbered 30 to one—to fight a delaying action that allowed some townspeople to escape. The Tuscarora sent a party of warriors to blow horns along the escarpment and suggest a larger force, while another party attacked downhill with war whoops, to give an exaggerated impression of their numbers. The attacking force burned Lewiston, as well as the Tuscarora village, both of which undefended.

=== 20th century ===
The Tuscarora Nation has continued to struggle to protect its land in New York. In the mid-20th century, New York City commissioner Robert Moses generated controversy by negotiating with the Tuscarora Sachem council and purchasing 550 acres (220 ha) of the Tuscarora reservation for the reservoir of the new hydroelectric project along the Niagara River, downriver from Niagara Falls. (At the time of first power generation in February 1962, it was the largest project in the world.) The plant continues to generate electricity for households located from the Niagara area to as far away as New York City.

== Notable Tuscarora Nation people ==
- Wallace "Mad Bear" Anderson (1927–1985), Native activist
- David Cusick (c. 1780–1840), artist and author
- Dennis Cusick (c. 1800–1824), painter
- John Napoleon Brinton Hewitt (1859–1937), linguist and ethnographer
- Frank Mount Pleasant (1884–1937), athlete
- Clinton Rickard (1882–1971), Native activist
- Jolene Rickard (Turtle clan, b. 1956), artist, curator, visual historian

== See also ==
- Tuscarora First Nation
- Tuscarora people
- Tuscarora Reservation
