= Becky Wydysh =

American politician

Member-elect of the New York State Assembly from the 145th district
- Assuming office January 2027
- Succeeding: Angelo Morinello

Personal details
- Party: Republican

Becky Wydysh is an American politician. A member of the Republican Party, she is the member-elect for the 145th district of the New York State Assembly.
