= Animated object =

An animated object is an item, or set of items in media which can act separately from its explicit use by people. This may occur through some sort of supernatural means. When animated, objects may act on a specific purpose or use, or may act on their own accord.

Various forms of animated objects, ranging from household tools to armor, have appeared in stories throughout history. Such characters have continued to be referenced in modern media, with some examples in movies like Disney's Fantasia, and other appearances in games.

== History ==
One possible origin for the concept of animated object is from a form of animism or animatism. These beliefs suggest that an object either innately possesses or receives a soul.

Stories beginning from the late Heian period in Japan mention tsukumogami, or "tool specters." These stories describe that household tools would, after a century, receive souls. Often resentful of being abandoned, these spirits would cause trouble for their former masters.

Later stories describe differing forms for an animated object. Some follow more closely with ideas of personification, with an object being described as sentient but following with their purpose as an object. Others, similarly to the tsukumogami, act independently. These stories may also include the usage of an outside force as a means to animate an object. In these cases, a witch or other magical being often acts as the "origin" for an object's animation. In the Danish folktale "The Wonderful Pot," a pot is given to a family by a stranger. Upon setting the pot on a fire at its request, it travels to the house of a rich man. Over the course of several days, the pot tricks the man to take money and supplies over the course of several days, bringing them back to the home of the family to sustain them.

== Media ==
=== Film ===
The Walt Disney Company has used animated objects in multiple films. Significantly, they have been present in the anthology film Fantasia, released in 1940. In the show's program The Sorcerer's Apprentice, the character Mickey Mouse brings a broomstick to life to life in order to do his work of carrying water. He falls asleep, only to find that the broom has flooded the house while he was unaware. When he attempts to destroy the broom, it multiplies, with each subsequent broom only continuing to carry more buckets. Eventually, the sorcerer returns, putting an end to the trouble.

Additionally, animated armor plays a role in Disney's film adaptation of Bedknobs and Broomsticks. In the film, the character of Ms. Price, a witch, uses the spell "Substitutiary Locomotion" to bring the sets of armor in a museum to life in the climax of the film, in order to help fight off Nazis attacking the setting's village.

=== Games ===
In the video game Kingdom Hearts III, the Lingering Will is a set of armor animated by the spirit of Terra, a previous protagonist.

In the tabletop role-playing game Dungeons and Dragons, there are multiple instances of animated objects, including "Animated Armor," a construct which has been animated via magical means. In the campaign setting Curse of Strahd, a unique form of this construct is used to patrol Castle Ravenloft. Similarly, the game describes an "Animated Flying Sword."
