= Angelo Morinello =

American politician

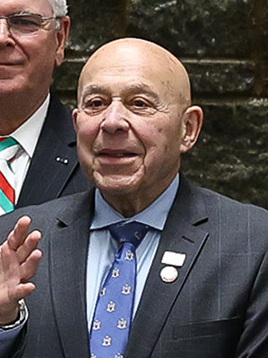

Member of the New York State Assembly from the 145th district
- Incumbent
- Assumed office January 1, 2017
- Preceded by: John Ceretto
- Succeeded by: Becky Wydysh (elect)

Judge of the Niagara Falls City Court
- In office 2001–2015

Personal details
- Party: Republican
- Website: Official website

Angelo J. Morinello is the Assembly member for the 145th District of the New York State Assembly. He is a Republican. The district includes Niagara Falls, North Tonawanda as well as Lewiston in Erie and Niagara counties.

== Life and career ==
Morinello was born and raised in Western New York, and is a veteran of the War in Vietnam. An attorney, Morinello served as the in-house counsel for his family's business, Certo Brothers Distributing Company. He previously served as an assistant Nassau County district attorney, as well as the counsel to Niagara Falls Community Development.

Previously, Morinello served as Niagara Falls City Court judge from 2001 to 2015.

== New York State Assembly ==
In 2016, Assemblyman John Ceretto switched parties, becoming a Democrat after initially being elected as a Republican. Ceretto had previously been a Democrat, but rode the Republican wave into office in 2010, before voting more often with Democrats in his second term. While the district was competitive on paper, it historically had supported Republicans.

Morinello was drafted by Republicans to run against Ceretto in 2016. The campaign was one of the most expensive Assembly races of the cycle. In a good year for Republicans, he defeated Ceretto 55% to 45%. He was sworn into office on January 1, 2017.

Political offices
Preceded by John Ceretto	New York Assembly, 145th District; 2017–present	Incumbent
