= Väki =

Supernatural power in Finnish mythology

Väki is a supernatural power in Finnish mythology. It was believed by Baltic Finns that väki resided in natural sites, objects, and animals. Väki has been compared to mana. However, according to Laura Stark, väki is about an impersonal power rather than a universal force. Väki has also been compared to orenda.

Some folklorists have stated väki are in objects, especially ones connected to the world of the supernatural. The concept of väki was first documented in the 18th century by Christfrid Ganander in his book Mythologia Fennica.

According to Kaarle Krohn, väki originated from animistic beliefs. There is a lack of information regarding how most kinds of väki were used by tietäjä.

== Etymology ==
The word väki is polysemic with two interrelated meanings: a) strength or power, and b) a troop. In modern Finnish, väki means a crowd of people or inhabitants of a home or location. The word could also be translated to mean folk or people. The word väki also has a meaning of "strength, power", although in modern usage it mainly occurs as a modifier as in väkiviina "strong liquor". The term refers to both physical and magical power. The term väki is also used for a haltija or a group of them. This article discusses the meaning "magical or supernatural power".

== Types of väki ==
- If a väki caused disease, it would be called vihat (in plural). In modern Finnish, viha has the meaning "hate", but the original meaning was "poison".
- Kallion Väki: Väki of the cliffs, this väki was used in court cases. Considered to be the most difficult väki to control and only old men handled it.
- Kalman Väki: Kalman väki is the väki of death. It is believed that this väki is inside corpses, graveyards, and other things connected with burials. It is believed people can get infected by this väki if they eat soil that contains it, not performing rituals for the dead properly, or disrespecting the dead.
- Löylyn Väki: Väki of the sauna said to infect people with diseases.
- Maan Väki: This väki resided in the ground. It differs depending on the type of ground and was used for various reasons.
- Metsän Väki: This väki was for the forest or animals. It was believed väki from forests could invade the human body and cause disease.
- Tulen Väki: This väki resided in fire. It had the power to both infect and heal. It is also considered the most powerful väki.
- Veden Väki: Väki that resides in bodies of water like lakes, bonds, or wells.
- Vitun väki: Väki emanated by females and particularly female genitalia. It was believed that it could corrupt objects that belong to the men's remit. For example, if a woman jumped over a fishing net, it was believed that the net would lose its ability to catch fish. There are many examples of spell poems against vitun vihat (harmful magical influence of the female genitalia) in the Finnish-Karelian sphere. Nevertheless, it was also viewed positively in some contexts: performing anasyrma (Finnish: harakointi) on hunting implements was believe to enhance their power.

== See also ==
- Haltija
- Orenda
