= Erminnie A. Smith =

American ethnologist (1836–1886)

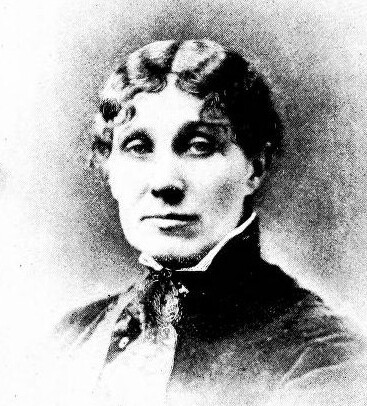
- Born: Erminnie Adelle Platt; April 26, 1836; Marcellus, New York
- Died: June 9, 1886 (aged 50); Jersey City, New Jersey
- Resting place: New York Bay Cemetery
- Citizenship: United States
- Education: Emma Willard School
- Known for: Published works on the Haudenosaunee people and founder of the Aesthetic Society of Jersey City
- Spouse: Simeon H. Smith (m. 1855)
- Scientific career
- Fields: Ethnography
- Workplaces: Smithsonian Institution

Erminnie Adelle Smith (née Platt; April 26, 1836– June 9, 1886) was a linguist, ethnologist, anthropologist and geologist who worked at the Smithsonian Institution's Bureau of American Ethnology. She has been called the "first woman field ethnographer" and was the first female member elected to the New York Academy of Sciences on November 5, 1877.

Erminnie Smith published multiple works on the language and culture of the Haudenosaunee (Iroquois) people. She was active in cataloging their legends and employed John Napoleon Brinton Hewitt to assist in this work. Her work on the Haudenosaunee, along with that of Alice Fletcher on the Omaha and other tribes, and Matilda Coxe Stevenson on the Zuni people, challenged views of women's position in both indigenous North American and Victorian societies. Smith's accounts showed that Haudenosaunee women held rights to property and other social freedoms that American and European women lacked, and that they were honored and respected for their involvement and contributions to culture, economics and ritual practice.

== Early life and education ==
Erminnie Adelle Platt was born April 26, 1836 (sometimes given as 1839), in Marcellus, New York, to Joseph and Ermina Dodge Platt. She graduated in 1853 from the Troy Female Seminary (later known as the Emma Willard School) in Troy, New York. She married Simeon H. Smith of Chicago in 1855.

Smith spent four years in Germany while her sons attended school. During that time, she completed a degree in geology at the School of Mines, Freiburg, Saxony. Smith accumulated a private collection of geological specimens, one of the largest for its time in the United States. After her death this collection was inherited by her sons.

== Career ==
In 1876, Smith founded the Aesthetic Society of Jersey City, a women's club which grew to over 500 members. They met to discuss topics in science, literature and art, first at her home at 203 Pacific Avenue and later at the Lafayette Reformed Church of Jersey City. Smith served as president of the women's club from 1879 to 1886, and often lectured at their monthly receptions. She is frequently referred to in Echoes of the Aesthetic Society of Jersey City, a collection of poems and essays from meetings of the society. Following her death, the society established an award in her honor and published a small souvenir collection with some of her poems and essays as well as memorial tributes, In Memoriam Mrs. Erminnie A. Smith. In addition to the Aesthetic Society of Jersey City, Smith was a member of the women's club Sorosis.

By 1880, when she was recruited by the Bureau of American Ethnology of the Smithsonian Institution in Washington, D.C., Smith was an expert on the Haudenosaunee in the United States and Canada, which included the Cayuga, Mohawk, Oneida, Onondaga, Seneca and Tuscarora people. As part of her work for the Smithsonian, she published reports on Iroquois language and customs including Myths of the Iroquois (1883). Smith transcribed and classified over 15,000 words in Iroquois dialects. She was adopted into the Tuscarora tribe in Canada and named Ka-tei-tei-sta-kwast (beautiful flower). The Iroquois-English dictionary she prepared was published following her death.

Smith was a member of the American Association for the Advancement of Science and served as secretary of its geology and geography section in 1885. Smith became the first woman elected to the New York Academy of Sciences, on November 5, 1877. She was also a member of the Women's Anthropological Society of America, to which she presented "Reminiscences of Life among the Iroquois Indians in the Province of Quebec" and of the Historical Society of New York. Smith's other memberships included the London Scientific Society and the Numismatic and Antiquarian Society of Philadelphia.

Erminnie Smith died at home in Jersey City, New Jersey on June 9, 1886. Following a service at the Lafayette Reformed Church, she was buried in New York Bay Cemetery.

== Selected works ==
- Myths of the Iroquois, 1883.

== See also ==
- Timeline of women in science
