= Animatism =

Class of religious beliefs

Animatism is a term coined by British anthropologist Robert Marett in the context of his teleological theory of the evolution of religion. It refers to "a belief in a generalised, impersonal power over which people have some measure of control". Marett argues that certain cultures believe "people, animals, plants, and inanimate objects were endowed with certain powers, which were both impersonal and supernatural." Mana, Marett states, is a concentrated form of animatistic force found within any of these objects that confer power, strength, and success.

Animatism is a belief that inanimate, miraculous qualities exists in the natural world. It also talks about the belief that everything is infused with a life force giving each lifeless object personality or perception, but not a soul as in animism. It is a widespread belief among small-scale societies. In South Pacific regions, such as Melanesia and Polynesia, this belief comes in form of manaism, which is derived from mana.

Many indigenous cultures believe in animatism. They believe that worshipping inanimate objects will drive them away from the evil forces around. These groups also believe that the inanimate objects they worship have mystical powers that are sent by God to help them on Earth.

== See also ==
- Animism
- Orenda
- Religion
