= Marian E. White =

American archaeologist

- Born: Marian Emily White; August 28, 1921; Hartland, New York, US
- Died: October 31, 1975 (aged 54)
- Education: University of Michigan
- Known for: studying the Iroquois of the Niagara Frontier
- Awards: Cornplanter Medal (1975)

Marian Emily White (28 August 1921 — 31 October 1975) was an American archaeologist and university professor. During her career, White conducted research on the Neutral Nation, Erie people and the Wenrohronon in the Niagara Frontier. White posthumously won the 1975 Cornplanter Medal.

== Early life and education ==
White was born on 28 August 1921 in Hartland, New York. In 1942, she graduated from Cornell University with a Bachelor of Arts in classical languages and a minor in anthropology.

== Career ==
Upon completing her Bachelor of Arts in 1942, White was a clerk in statistics for the Cornell University College of Agriculture and Life Sciences until 1943. Her studies were interrupted by the outbreak of World War II and she joined the war effort by working as an IBM Tabulator Machine Operator for the United States Army until the end of 1945. After the war, White worked as a tour guide from 1946 to 1952 for the Buffalo Museum of Science.

From the late 1950s to the late 1970s, White was an archaeologist studying the Iroquois of the Niagara Frontier. She conducted excavations of archaeological sites determining the history of the Neutral Nation, Erie people and the Wenrohronon. Some of her investigations included the Van Son Cemetery in Grand Island, New York and the Kleis Site.

In 1952, White attended the University of Michigan, obtaining a Master of Arts in 1953 and a Doctor of Philosophy in 1956 after defending her thesis on Iroquois culture history in the Niagara Frontier area of New York State. She was the first woman to be awarded a PhD from the Department of Anthropology at the University of Michigan.

White began her anthropology career for the Rochester Museum of Arts and Sciences in 1956 as a researcher before moving to the University of Buffalo in 1959 where she continued her research before becoming a lecturer in 1960 and professor in 1968. In 1958, White returned to the Buffalo Museum of Science as an assistant curator of anthropology. She also became an assistant curator of archaeology at the Buffalo and Erie County Historical Society. She also founded the highway salvage program at UB in 1969 to document archaeological sites threatened by highway projects in Western New York.

Another aspect of White's career was education and advocacy for the Indigenous groups she studied in the region.

At the end of her career, White created the New York Archaeological Council and served as president from 1972 to 1974. The council's purpose was to advocate for and maintain the preservation of standards and quality control of the contract projects within New York.

== Awards and honours ==
In 1975, White was posthumously awarded the Cornplanter Medal. The University of Buffalo established the Marian E. White Research Museum in 1979.

== Death ==
White died on 31 October 1975 from cancer.
