= Walter K. Long =

American painter

- Born: February 4, 1904; Auburn, New York
- Died: January 4, 1986 (aged 81); Auburn, New York
- Occupations: Artist, historian, teacher
- Known for: Work on Mount Rushmore

Walter K. Long (February 4, 1904 – January 4, 1986) was an artist, historian, museum director, inventor and teacher who was notable for being a contributor to the Mount Rushmore monument.

== Biography ==
Long was born in Auburn, New York, and spent most of his life there. He was the director of the Cayuga County Museum of History and Art. He also taught at Cayuga Community College, as well as briefly at the Sorbonne in Paris, France, and at the Rochester Institute of Technology.

Long points to a large photograph which shows the George Washington bust on Mount Rushmore. "See that little bug clinging to Washington's nose?" he asks. "That little bug is me in 1935."

— Auburn Citizen Advertiser, Sunday September 16, 1979

Long assisted Mount Rushmore sculptor Gutzon Borglum through careful measurements and studies of busts of the faces on the monument, in particular George Washington. Long helped with some of the on-site work as well, including at the rock face.

Long was a member of the Finger Lakes commission to the New York World's Fair in 1939.

During World War II Long worked as an instrument designer at Bausch and Lomb, Welch Allyn and IRI. He was awarded several patents for his designs.

In 1959 Long organized an exhibit of Queen Victoria memorabilia at the Cayuga museum he directed. It was a popular exhibit and had to be held over beyond its original scheduled run. The core of the exhibit was memorabilia collected by Helen Hayes via donations from fans in Britain, in admiration of Hayes' portrayal of the queen. Long added other memorabilia as well.

Long is credited with resurrecting the Cornplanter Medal in the early 1960s. The medal was not awarded for nearly 40 years, even though originally it was intended to be awarded every two years, with some allowance for irregularity. However, when Edwin Gohl was named the winner in 1926, it caused a dispute over whether it was appropriate for the award to go to local amateurs instead of academic professions. Long was able to bridge any remaining gap in philosophy and in 1965 it was awarded to William N. Fenton. Long himself was named a winner of the medal in 1975.

Over the course of his career Long received many awards and recognition in art, history and teaching including fellow of the International Institute of History and Art, and member of UNESCO.

Long and his wife Carmelita had three children. He died at his home in Auburn on January 4, 1986.

== Walter K. Long patents ==
List of patents
- US2435400A, Long, Walter K., "Laryngoscope", issued February 3, 1948
- US2466958A, Long, Walter K., "Portable vision test chart illuminator", issued April 12, 1949
- US2478662A, Long, Walter K., "Portable vision testing kit having an eye testing target chart and illuminating means therefor", issued August 9, 1949
- USD163210S, Long, Walter K., "Instrument case ", issued May 8, 1951
- USD165177S, Long, Walter K., "Long ophthalmoscope head", issued November 13, 1951
- US2850941A, Long, Walter K., "Device for measuring light transmission", issued September 9, 1958
