= Cornplanter Medal =

Award in Haudenosaunee anthropology

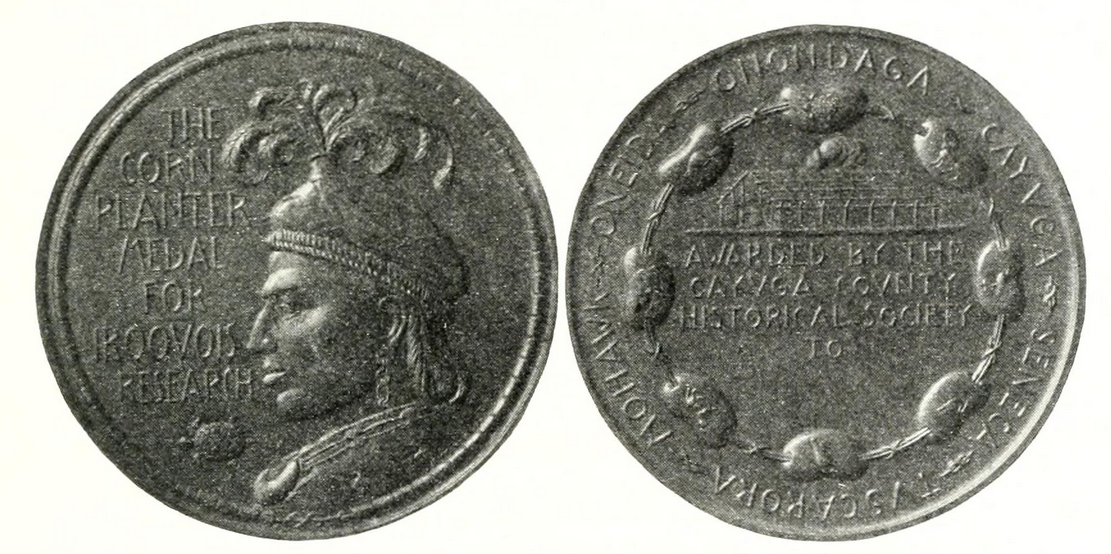
Cornplanter Medal as first struck by Tiffany in 1904.

The Cornplanter Medal is an award for scholastic and other contributions to the betterment of knowledge of the Haudenosaunee people. Named for the Seneca chief Cornplanter, the award was initiated by University of Chicago anthropologist Frederick Starr with seed money from nine associates in order to engrave and print sketches of Haudenosaunee games and dances. Starr had two main goals while he planned the medal:

One, he wanted to recognize and award the people who were contributing to research and knowledge of the Haudenosaunee.

Two, he intended to prove that the tribe, contrary to some academic opinion, had artisans that showed abilities of a "true artist", by presenting and preserving the art of the Haudenosaunee youth Jesse Cornplanter.

The medal was endowed through sales of the publication of the sketches in the booklet Iroquois Indian Games and Dances (c. 1903). The young artist of the sketches was credited as "Jesse Cornplanter, Seneca Indian Boy".

First presented in 1904 by the Cayuga County Historical Society in Auburn NY, it was awarded every two years to people who fall into one or more of the following classes:

- Ethnologists, making worthy field-studies or other investigations among the Iroquois.
- Historians, making actual contributions to our knowledge of the Iroquois.
- Artists, worthily representing Iroquois life or types by brush or chisel.
- Philanthropists, whose efforts are based upon adequate scientific study and appreciation of Iroquois conditions and needs.

== List of medal recipients ==
- 1904 General John S. Clark, historian and archaeologist
- 1906 Rev. William Martin Beauchamp, archaeologist and ethnologist
- 1908 Dr. David Boyle, archaeologist and ethnologist
- 1910 William P. Letchworth, philanthropist
- 1912 Reuben Gold Thwaites, historian
- 1914 J. N. B. Hewitt, ethnologist
- 1916 Arthur C. Parker, archaeologist and ethnologist
- 1919 Alvin H. Dewey, philanthropist
- 1920 Mary Clark Thompson, philanthropist
- 1923 Professor Frederick Houghton, archaeologist
- 1926 Edwin H. Gohl, archaeologist and artist
- 1965 William N. Fenton, ethnologist and historian
- 1966 William A. Ritchie, archaeologist
- 1967 Merle H. Deardorff, ethnologist and historian
- 1968 Aldelphena Logan, artist
- 1969 Kenneth E. Kidd, historian and archaeologist
- 1970 Anthony F. C. Wallace, ethnologist and historian
- 1971 Floyd G. Lounsbury, linguist and ethnologist
- 1975 Marian E. White, archaeologist and historian; and Walter K. Long, artist
- 1977 Richard S. MacNeish, archaeologist
- 1979 Bruce G. Trigger, historian and archaeologist

== See also ==
- List of archaeology awards
- List of history awards
