= Francine DelMonte =

American politician

Francine DelMonte (D-Lewiston) is a former member of the New York State Assembly who represented the former 138th Assembly District in New York State. She lost the Democratic primary to former Niagara Falls City Councilman, John Accardo (D-Niagara Falls) in September 2010. She ultimately ran on the Working Families Party line. She was succeeded by former Niagara County Legislator John Ceretto (R-Lewiston). The 138th District encompassed several municipalities including the towns of Lewiston, Cambria, Wilson, Porter, Niagara, Wheatfield, Newfane, and Hartland, the City of Niagara Falls, and the Tuscarora Indian Reservation in Lewiston.

Before serving the 138th District, she was a reporter for the Niagara Gazette. She then served as Chief of Staff for then-Assemblyman Joseph Pillittere. When Pillittere announced his retirement in 1998, DelMonte announced her candidacy. DelMonte lost the Democratic Party primary to then-Niagara County Legislator Renae Kimble and ultimately ran on a third-party line, where she and Kimble were defeated by Robert Daly, who ran on the Republican Party line. Robert Daly replaced Pillittere in January 1998, and Renae Kimble continued serving as a Niagara County Legislator in Niagara Falls until she retired in 2011. DelMonte ran successfully, with the endorsement of the Democratic Party, in 2000, defeating the incumbent Daly.

While in the Assembly, DelMonte authored legislation creating the Niagara Wine Trail, which supports the growing wine industry by attracting thousands of visitors each year. DelMonte has fought for the continued growth of the wine trail and has supported this growing industry.

DelMonte also introduced legislation to create the Underground Railroad Heritage Commission to provide an opportunity for students and families to learn about the role Niagara Falls played during the Civil War, possibly increasing heritage tourism in Niagara Falls with the construction of a new museum and rail terminal.

Niagara Falls also hosts the Seneca Niagara Casino, the state's first urban based Native American casino. Assemblywoman DelMonte championed controversial legislation authorizing the governor to negotiate a compact with the Seneca Nation.

She has also helped secure a portion of the funding for the construction of a new terminal at the Niagara Falls International Airport and secured a $6.6 million grant for Niagara County Community College to create a new culinary arts facility for downtown Niagara Falls within the former Rainbow Centre Factory Outlet. Originally, she was against the proposal for a new airport due to the opinion of Ex-Niagara Falls Mayor Vince Anello.

Assemblywoman DelMonte is an advocate on environmental issues in her district. She has sponsored legislation that prohibits the transport of PCB's from the Hudson River cleanup to the CWM waste disposal site in the Town of Porter.

DelMonte graduated from Buffalo State College and completed course work for a Master of Arts degree from SUNY Albany. She is a lifelong resident of Niagara County. DelMonte was a member of the Agriculture, Economic Development, Racing and Wagering, Energy, Tourism, and Transportation committees. DelMonte was also the Chair of the Assembly Commission on Science and Technology.

New York State Assembly
Preceded by Robert A. Daly	New York State Assembly, 138th District; 2001–2010	Succeeded by John Ceretto
