= Smokin Joes Trading Post =

American cigarette manufacturer and retailer

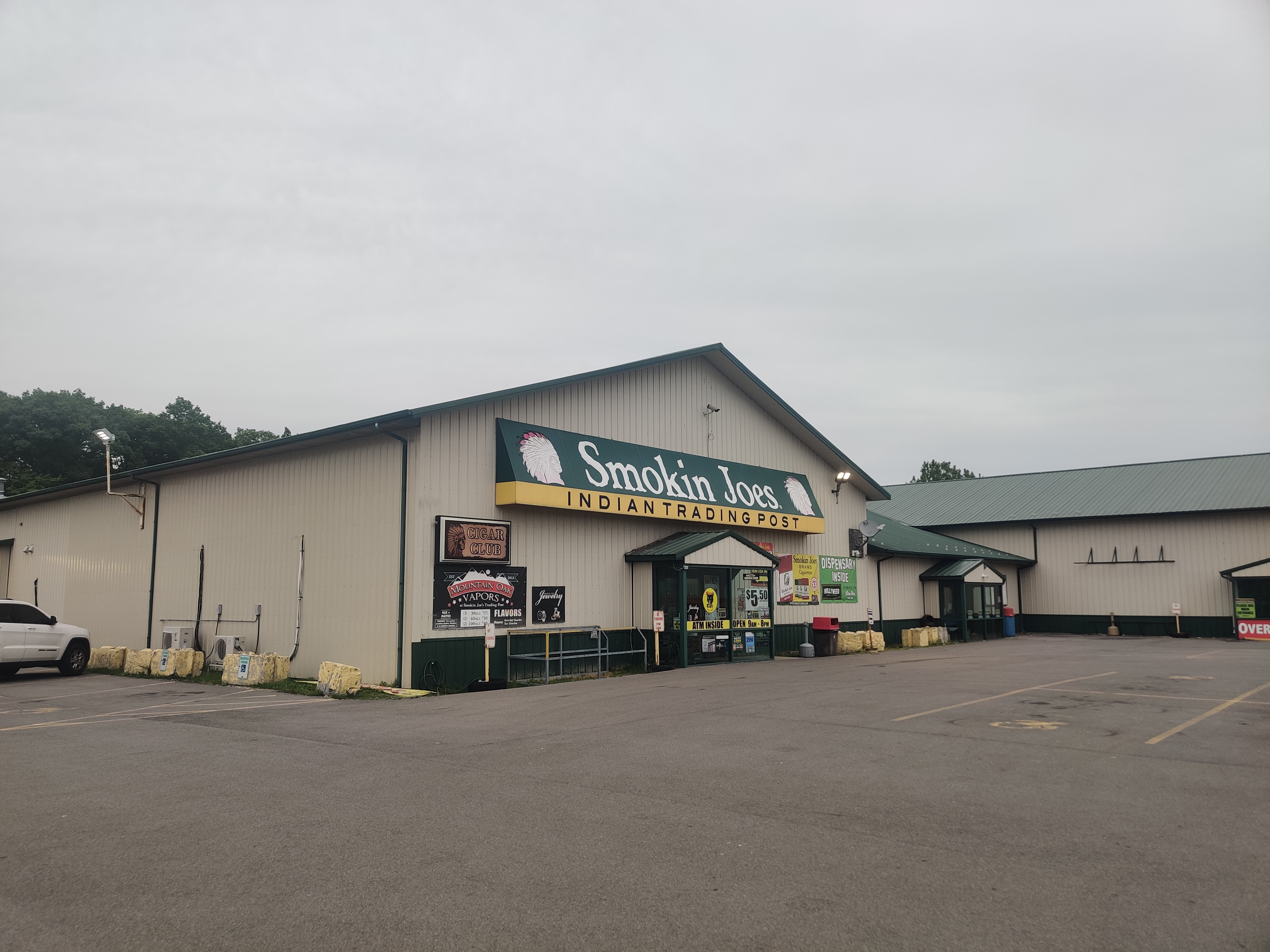
- Photo of the store, May 2024
- Industry: Tobacco and Gasoline
- Founder: Joe Anderson
- Number of locations: 3 (2024)
- Area served: Tuscarora Reservation
- Owner: Joe Anderson
- Website: smokinjoes.com

Smokin Joes Trading Post is an American cigarette manufacturer and retailer headquartered in Niagara County, New York. It was founded by Joe Anderson in 1985.

== History ==
Anderson, a member of the Tuscaroran tribe, started the Smokin Joes Trading Post company in 1985 out of his unheated trailer. The company employed tax loopholes to sell tobacco and gasoline products on New York reservations, first establishing a Smokin Joes Brand cigarette production facility on the Tuscarora reservation in 1994 before expanding production to other reservations.

In 2013, Anderson was sued by the United States for $2.4 million in tobacco assets.

In 2018, New York State bought 11 acres of land in Niagara Falls from Smokin Joes for $25 million.
