= New York's 145th State Assembly district =

American legislative district

Assemblymember
Angelo Morinello; R–Niagara Falls

New York's 145th State Assembly district is one of the 150 districts in the New York State Assembly. It has been represented by Angelo Morinello since 2017. In 2026, he announced that he would not run for re-election.

== Geography ==
=== 2020s ===
District 145 contains the town of Grand Island in Erie County and the western portion of Niagara County. It also includes a portion of the town of North Tonawanda.

=== 2010s ===
District 145 contained the town of Grand Island in Erie County and the southern portion of Niagara County.

== Recent election results ==
=== 2026 ===
2026 New York State Assembly election, District 145
Party	Candidate	Votes	%
Republican	Becky Wydysh		
Conservative	Becky Wydysh		
Total	Becky Wydysh		
Democratic	Nathan McMurray		
Write-in			
Total votes			

=== 2024 ===
2024 New York State Assembly election, District 145
Party	Candidate	Votes	%
Republican	Angelo Morinello	32,411	
Conservative	Angelo Morinello	5,256	
Total	Angelo Morinello (incumbent)	37,667	61.3
Democratic	Jeffrey Elder	22,001	
Working Families	Jeffrey Elder	1,773	
Total	Jeffrey Elder	23,774	38.7
Write-in		22	0.0
Total votes		61,463	100.0
Republican hold			

=== 2022 ===
2022 New York State Assembly election, District 145
Party	Candidate	Votes	%
Republican	Angelo Morinello	24,730	
Conservative	Angelo Morinello	5,401	
Total	Angelo Morinello (incumbent)	30,131	63.4
Democratic	Douglas Mooradian	17,347	36.6
Write-in		17	0.0
Total votes		47,495	100.0
Republican hold			

=== 2020 ===
2020 New York State Assembly election, District 145
Party	Candidate	Votes	%
Republican	Angelo Morinello	32,581	
Conservative	Angelo Morinello	5,390	
Independence	Angelo Morinello	5,068	
Libertarian	Angelo Morinello	1,216	
Total	Angelo Morinello (incumbent)	44,255	99.3
Write-in		330	0.7
Total votes		44,585	100.0
Republican hold			

=== 2018 ===
2018 New York State Assembly election, District 145
Party	Candidate	Votes	%
Republican	Angelo Morinello	23,443	
Conservative	Angelo Morinello	4,487	
Independence	Angelo Morinello	3,430	
Reform	Angelo Morinello	524	
Total	Angelo Morinello (incumbent)	31,884	99.4
Write-in		187	0.6
Total votes		32,071	100.0
Republican hold			

=== 2016 ===
During the 2014-16 legislative session, then Republican-incumbent John Ceretto switched parties.

2016 New York State Assembly election, District 145
Party	Candidate	Votes	%
Republican	Angelo Morinello	22,241	
Conservative	Angelo Morinello	4,404	
Independence	Angelo Morinello	1,483	
Reform	Angelo Morinello	253	
Total	Angelo Morinello	28,381	54.6
Democratic	John Ceretto	21,642	
Working Families	John Ceretto	1,967	
Total	John Ceretto (incumbent)	23,609	45.4
Write-in		30	0.0
Total votes		52,020	100.0
Republican gain from Democratic			

=== 2014 ===
2014 New York State Assembly election, District 145
Party	Candidate	Votes	%
Republican	John Ceretto	15,986	
Conservative	John Ceretto	3,902	
Independence	John Ceretto	3,352	
Total	John Ceretto (incumbent)	23,240	99.8
Write-in		58	0.2
Total votes		23,298	100.0
Republican hold			

=== 2012 ===
2012 New York State Assembly election, District 145
Primary election
Party	Candidate	Votes	%
Working Families	Robert Restaino	43	84.3
Working Families	John Ceretto (incumbent)	8	15.7
Write-in		0	0.0
Total votes		51	100.0
General election
Republican	John Ceretto	21,263	
Conservative	John Ceretto	2,968	
Independence	John Ceretto	1,705	
Total	John Ceretto (incumbent)	25,936	50.9
Democratic	Robert Restaino	22,951	
Working Families	Robert Restaino	2,025	
Total	Robert Restaino	24,976	49.0
Write-in		32	0.1
Total votes		50,944	100.0
Republican hold			
