= Kleis Site =

- U.S. National Register of Historic Places
- Nearest city: Hamburg, New York
- NRHP reference No.: 79001580
- Added to NRHP: April 20, 1979

Kleis Site is an archeological site located in Hamburg in Erie County, New York. The site contains the remnants of a 17th-century Northern Iroquoian village and burial ground, and is one of a small number of Native American village locations on the Niagara Frontier.

Notable archaeological work was conducted at the site by archaeologist Marian E. White in the summer of 1959. Excavations at the site uncovered early 17th-century Iroquoian artifacts, European trade goods such as glass beads, and 12 single graves. The artifact assemblage dates the main occupation of the site to roughly 1625–1640 AD.

Although White was reluctant to assign a specific cultural affiliation, preferring to use the phrase Niagara Frontier Iroquois, current thinking is that the occupants of the site were Erie, a loose alliance of three to five culturally distinct groups living close to Lake Erie between Presque Isle Bay and Buffalo Creek. James Pendergast of the Canadian Museum of History further speculated that the Kleis site was occupied by the Erie group known as the Kahkwa by the Seneca and the Atra'kwae'ronnon by the Wendat.

In the late 1990s, unauthorized excavations supervised by Richard M. Gramly of Canisius University removed artifacts from the site as part of an archaeology field course. A lawsuit brought against Gramly by the Attorney General of New York and the Seneca Nation of Indians resulted in the repatriation of human remains and cultural artifacts to the Seneca.

The Kleis site was listed on the National Register of Historic Places in 1979.
