= Orenda =

Theorized spiritual power

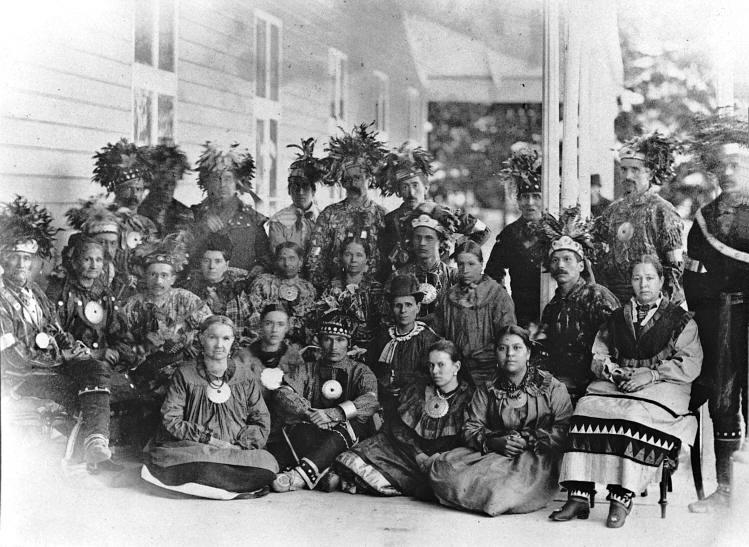
Black and white photograph of the Iroquoian language-speaking people known as the Wendat in 1880.

Orenda /ˈɔːrɛndə/ is the academic neologism for a theorized Iroquoian belief in an invisible force that pervades people and the rest of the world. It was coined in 1902 by J. N. B. Hewitt. It is argued that it is a spiritual/magical power that can be used by its possessor according to their will. Anthropologist J. N. B. Hewitt believed that orenda is a collective power of nature's energies through the living energy of all natural objects regardless of whether they are animate and inanimate. In his study of Seneca mythology, Arthur C. Parker views orenda as a magical power that makes its possessor the master of nature.

Hewitt's theory of orenda has been challenged by both scholars and indigenous communities who view it as misrepresenting core parts of the evidence available and the Haudenosaunee worldview.

== Definition ==
Orenda is defined in a variety of different ways. It is described by Hewitt variously as subsumed magical power, as a life force that pervades everything and a collective power of all of nature's energies, even inanimate people like rocks. Claude Levi-Strauss argues that orenda is "the conscious expression of a semantic function, whose role is to enable symbolic thinking to operate despite the contradiction inherent in it." Vine Delora Jr. views orenda as force field that permeates everything while also composing everything. Orenda is also described as the impulsive spirit of everything that makes people more engaged and productive by building desire to impact the world.

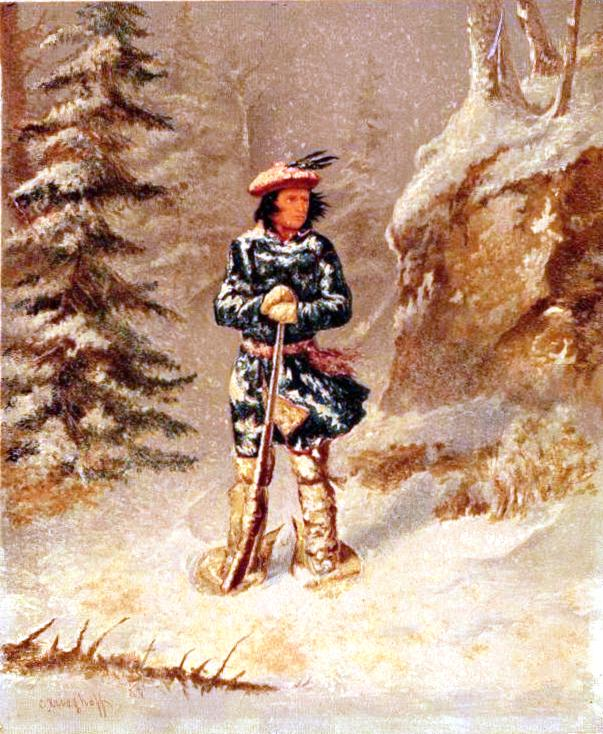
Drawing of a Haudenosaunee hunter.

The original word from which the neologism orenda is derived has many variants across time, dialects, languages and transliterations. In Iroquoian languages, it is referred to variously as orenna or karenna by the Mohawk, Cayuga, and Oneida; urente by the Tuscarora, and iarenda or orenda by the Wendat. The root of the term orenda is -renn, which refers to voice, speech, songs, poems and chants. The exact term orenda is a neologism made by Hewitt.

== Overview ==
Hewitt describes orenda as present in nature: storms are said to possess orenda. A strong connection exists between prayers and songs and orenda. Through song, a bird, a shaman, or a rabbit puts forth orenda. To Hewitt, the world is a battle of "warring orendas," which is an object's power, authority and potency to do magic. He describes the power as "a hypothetic potence or potentiality to do or effect results mystically." The 'war' between the orendas is sometimes described less as a violent battle and more as a dance where both participants are negotiating an outcome. Powerful people are those who are good at using this energy.

The Mohawk root that correlates with orenda, -ren, is part of many terms for important individuals, such as a shaman referred to as rarėndiowà;nėl, a fine hunter called rarėñdiio and a prophet or soothsayer called ratrėń;dats or hatrėňdótha. Evidenced by a story of a young hunter hiding from and dropping to the floor at the sound of a pursuing woman's voice, orenda also denotes charisma. Orenda transcends Western conceptions of charisma in that it makes charisma a communal rather than just individual matter, one that includes even nonhuman people. For example, one of the goals of a condolence ceremony is to assuage the orenda of the whole grieving family (ohwachira). Some sources disagree, stating that orenda is about personal desire and can make people happier so they work more for less.

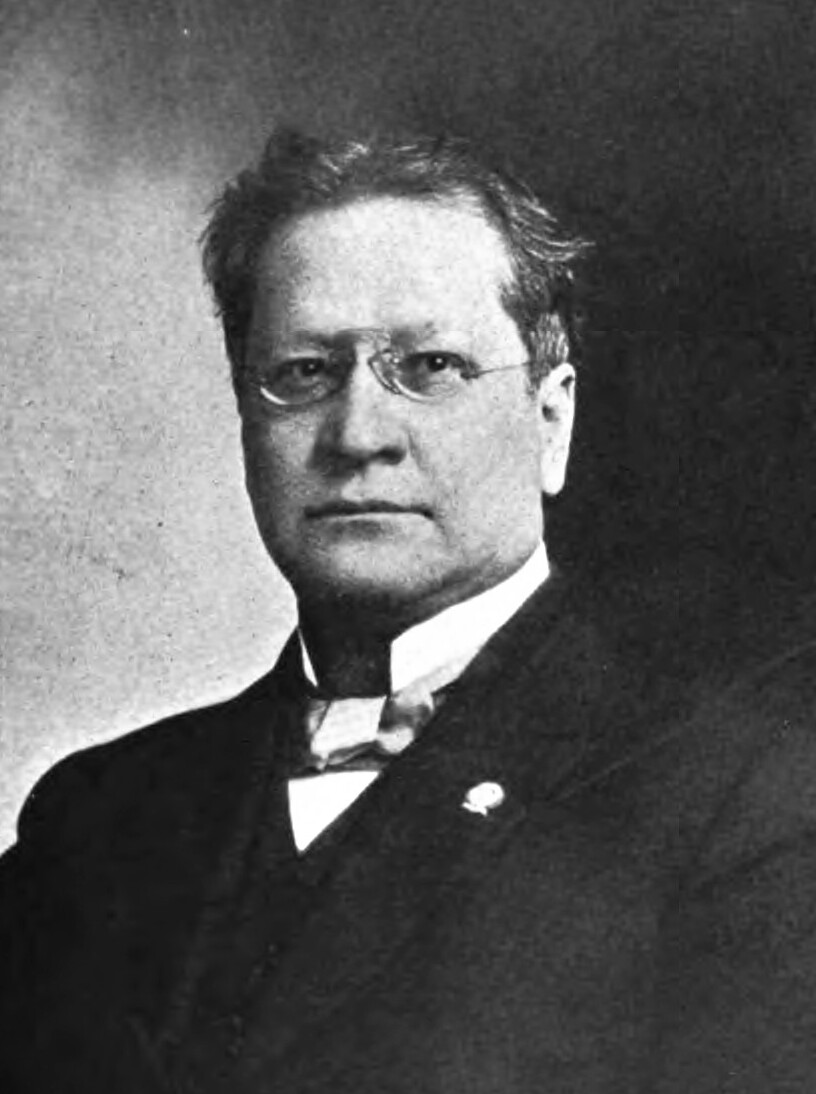
Photograph of J.N.B. Hewitt.

Orenda is inherent to people, whether to the person themselves or to objects that can be worn to use the object's orenda. There is evil and good orenda, with good orenda being generally more powerful, while bad orenda is done by witches, wizards and sorcerers to harm innocent people. Orenda gives an individual the ability to transform themselves into any other being, so any person in the natural world could be someone else transformed using their orenda, sometimes by assuming the other person's skin. Orenda is preserved by the Little Water Medicine Society which is primarily engaged in healing people. If one refuses to use their own medicine to help others or to pass it on to the next generation, their orenda will compel them to assume their proper role. Orenda manifests uniquely in each individual person and is a core part of someone's personhood.

Hewitt also argues that it is synonymous with other theorized beliefs in the field of anthropology from other Native American peoples, such as the wakan of the Sioux; the manitou of the Anishinaabe, and the pokunt of the Shoshone. Orenda was viewed by Max Weber as the same as the Zoroastrian Magi and the Polynesian supernatural force called Mana. Likewise Durkheim views orenda as an "exact equivalent" to Wakan and Mana. He describes them all as forms of Totemism. James Maffie, researcher of Aztec religion, compares orenda, alongside Wakan, Dao, Qi, Yii (Mixtec), Mana, Usen (Apache), Natoji (Blackfoot), Yowa (Cherokee), Nilchi (Navajo) and Manitou, with Teotl, which are all "single, primordial, processive all-encompassing and ever-flowing creative life force[s]." In his view, all of these are examples of constitutional monism and pantheism. Orenda has also been compared to theorized concepts in European neopaganism like the Väki of the Finnish.

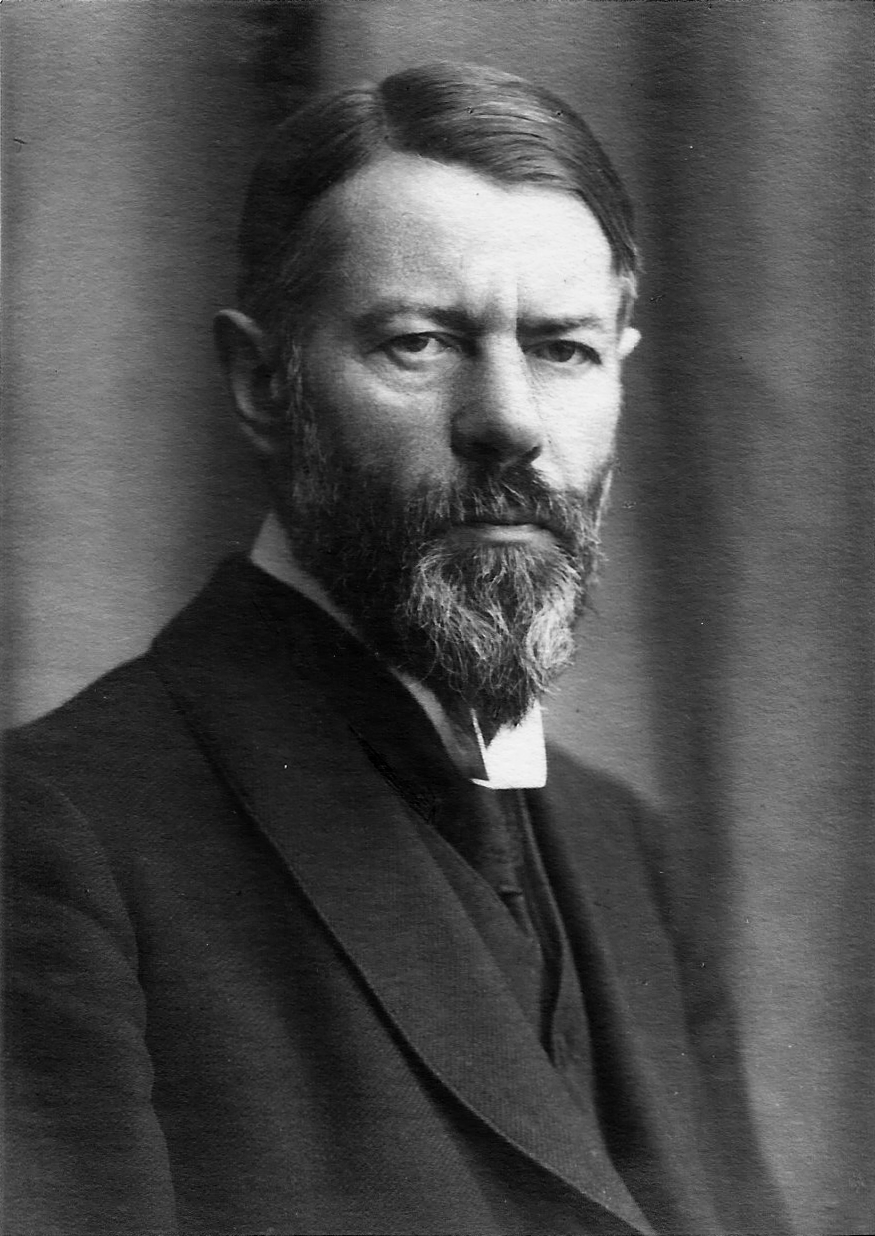
Photograph of Max Weber.

Orenda was part of a broader trend in scholarship at the time to borrow Indigenous words into the academic lexicon to then use them to make comparisons across religions. These other terms include totem (later used to coin Totemism), Taboo, Arunkulta (Arrernte), Hasina (Malagasy) and Brahman, along with previously mentioned Wakan, Manitou and Mana. Academics defended the practice by arguing that, "...are we not more likely to keep in touch with the obscure forces at work in rudimentary religion if we make what use we can of the clues lying ready to hand in the recorded efforts of rudimentary reflection upon religion?"

== Criticism ==
Shortly after Hewitt publicized the orenda theory, it faced many critics variously describing it as general, vague, useless and "euphonious." Others outright rejected the validity of the concept, saying there wasn't enough evidence to justify the claim. More recent scholars have argued that there is limited evidence for orenda, making it speculative and of limited value. For example, William Starna stated, "'many of us [scholars] believe [Hewitt] made things up." Indigenous researchers have also criticized the orenda theory, describing its popularity as "discouraging" According to Mohawk scholar Kevin White, "Hewitt may have been trying to entice or excite a 'magical' quality of Creation to his readership, which was predominantly Western Victorian readers, not Haudenosaunee". Hewitt is viewed as having engaged in universalism, distorting the actual ideas and compressing diverse Indigenous beliefs. He used the Wendat language, which he had little experience studying, to explain his understanding of the religious beliefs of the Haudenosaunee whom he worked with. He has been accused of "euroforming the data" by making Haudenosaunee medicine a single concept, knowingly presenting it as a manichaean dichotomy between good and evil and trivalizing it by calling it magic.

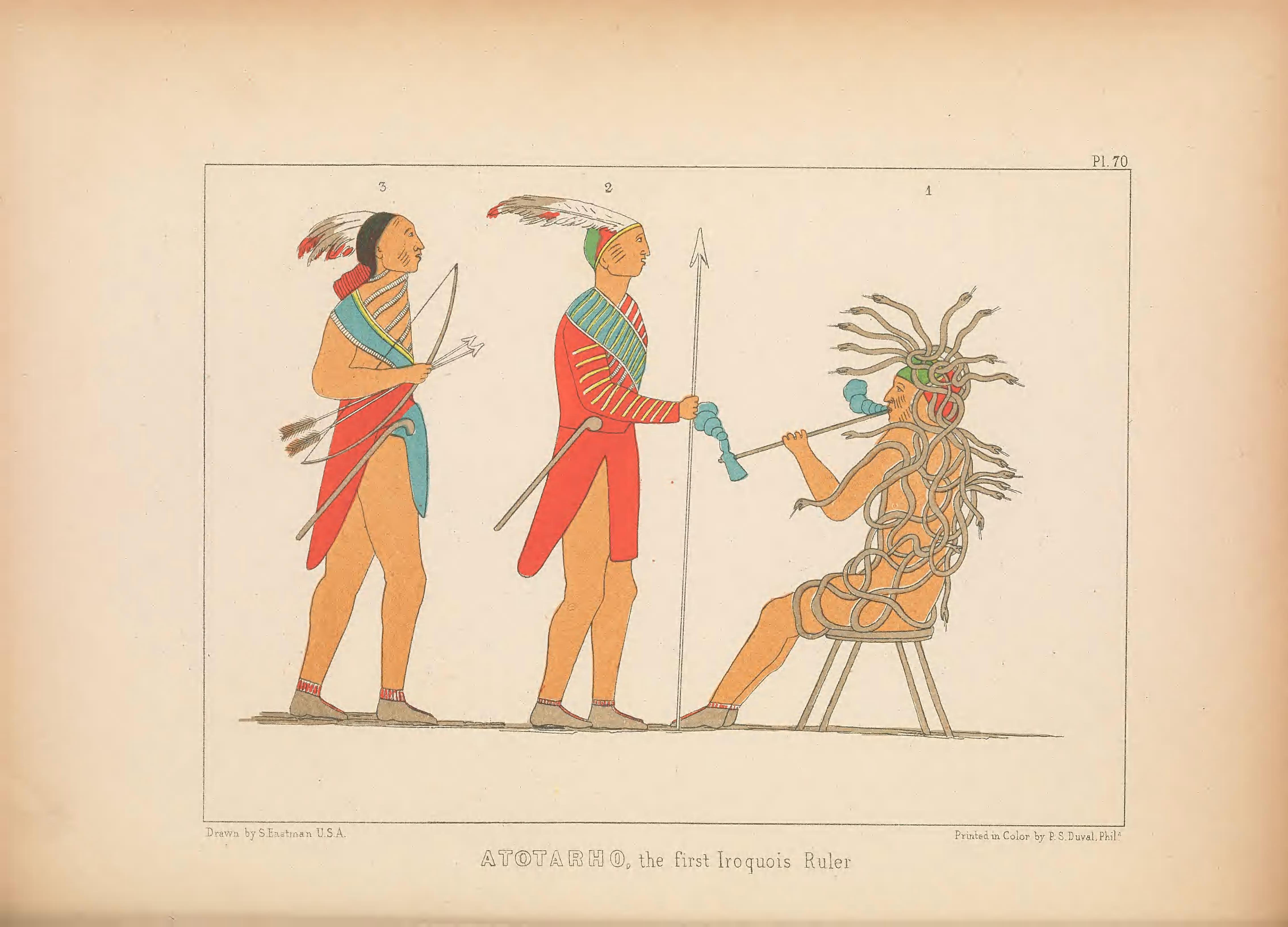
Drawing of the first Tadodaho, who was one of the people who founded the Haudenosaunee Confederacy and the Great Law of Peace.

Hewitt himself argued that orenda was a mark of ignorance and involved child-like thinking. It belongs to an earlier stage of humanity, before the enlightenment, that in his time was slowly dying out. Likewise, Weber believed it to be a remnant from an age of enchantment when primitive peoples lived in wonder of the world due to their ignorance. Orenda was generally considered a dead system by contemporary authors.

== Alternative views ==
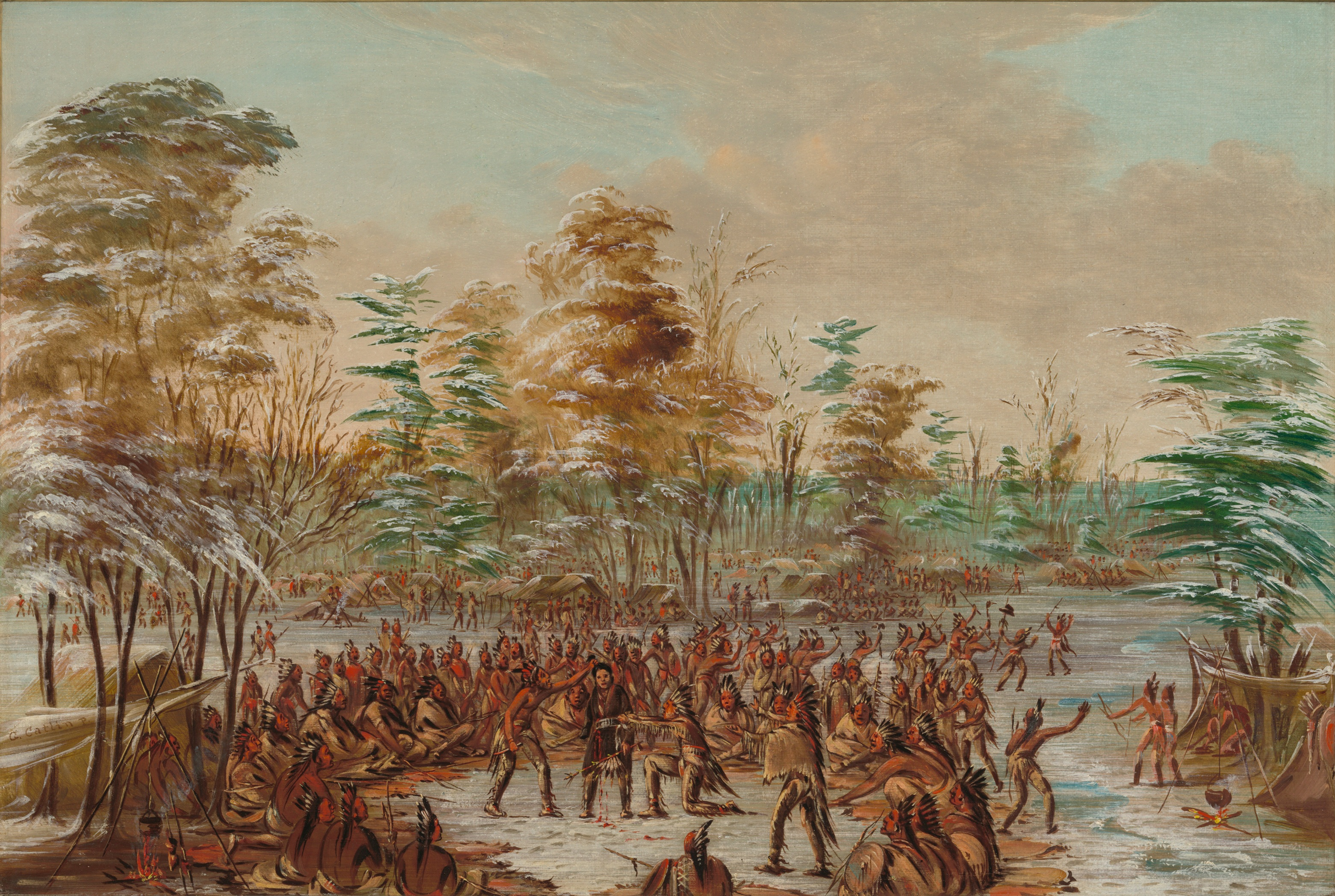
Reconstructed drawing of a French meeting with the Haudenosaunee to make peace.

Haudenosaunee people describe orenda (and its variants) as a word for a Haudenosaunee person's individual spirit. Orenda grows more powerful by abiding by their Haudenosaunee values and lifeways such as peace and keeping a good mind. It also grows as they get older and have learned from many life experiences. By nurturing their personal orenda they become fully human and capable of upholding society, as described by the Six Nations of the Grand River: "the ultimate power of the Great Law rests in how well the individual person develops their sense of self...in regard to the well-being of the others in the clan, in the village, in the nation and in the Confederacy of the Six Nations." The purpose of one's orenda is not to be superior or show off but to be used to benefit others, such as through ceremony. When a Haudenosaunee person cultivates their own orenda, they also empower the orenda of the other members of their community, as the Peacemaker and allies did during their creation of the League. Historian Barbara Alice Mann contends that Hewitt confused orenda with uki. Instead, she argues that an agonist and dualist relationship between uki and otkon is more faithful to the Haudenosaunee worldview. She argues this pairing together describes the world of Haudenosaunee medicine rather than just uki (orenda in Hewitt's view) in isolation.

== See also ==
- Animatism
- Elan vital
- Ghostbusters: Frozen Empire
- Jamiroquai
- Mesmerism
- New age
- Numinous
- Odic force
- Orgone
- Prana
- The Force
- The Orenda
- Vitalism

== Sources ==
- Hewitt, J. N. B. (1902). "Orenda and a Definition of Religion". American Anthropologist. 4 (1): 33–46. doi:10.1525/aa.1902.4.1.02a00050. JSTOR 658926.
