= Wallace "Mad Bear" Anderson =

Tuscarora activist (1927–1985)

- Born: Wallace Anderson; November 9, 1927; Tuscarora Indian Reservation in Lewiston, New York, United States
- Died: December 10, 1985 (aged 58)
- Citizenship: American, Tuscarora
- Occupation: Activist
- Military career
- Allegiance: United States of America
- Branch: United States Navy
- Conflicts: World War II; Korean War

Wallace "Mad Bear" Anderson (November 9, 1927 – December 10, 1985) was a Tuscarora activist predominantly active in the 1950s who became a spokesman for tribal sovereignty.

As a child, Anderson received the nickname "Mad Bear" from his grandmother due to his temper. As a young man, he enlisted in the U.S. Navy, serving during World War II in Okinawa, and later in Korea during the Korean War. Anderson became an activist for American Indians Rights after being rejected for a loan under the GI Bill to build a house on the Tuscarora reservation.

== Income Tax Protests ==
Anderson led protests against Haudenosaunee payment of New York State income taxes in 1957. Several hundred Akwesasne Mohawks marched to the Massena, New York courthouse to burn court summons that were issued for unpaid taxes.

== Tuscarora Reservoir Protest ==
The Power Authority of the State of New York seized Tuscarora Reservation land to build a reservoir to flood the land. Anderson was a key figure in the protest against the Tuscarora Reservoir, blocking surveyors from entering the reservation and deflating tires of workers, as well as lying in the road to block trucks. Despite the protest efforts, the U.S. Supreme Court eventually ruled that the taking of the land was legal and the reservoir was built.

== Declaration of Sovereignty ==
In March 1959, Anderson helped to lead a revolt and declaration of sovereignty at the Six Nations Reserve in Brantford, Ontario, the borough founded by Joseph Brant. Following this declaration, twelve Royal Canadian Mounted Police entered the reserve's council house, but the Haudenosaunee forced them out.
