= J. N. B. Hewitt =

American linguist (1859–1937)

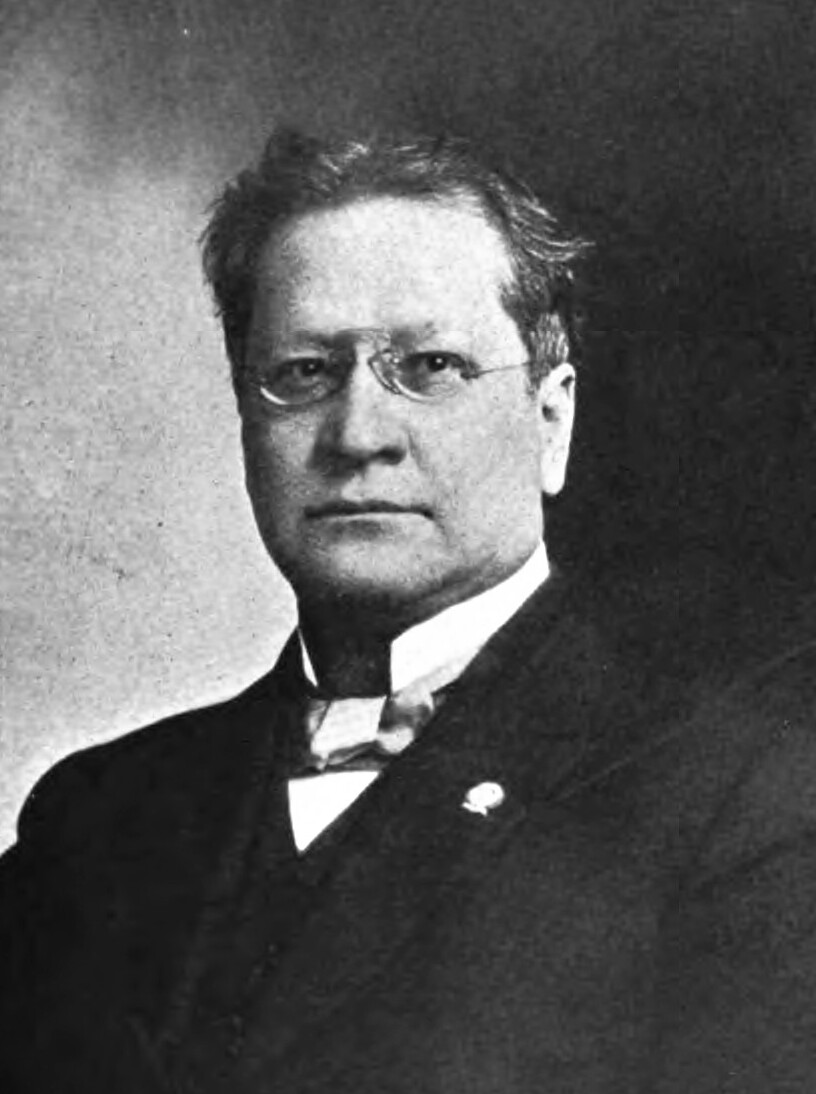
- Born: John Napoleon Brinton Hewitt; December 16, 1859; Tuscarora Reservation, New York, U.S.
- Died: October 14, 1937 (aged 77); Washington, D.C., U.S.
- Resting place: Rock Creek Cemetery
- Known for: Contributions to Iroquoian linguistics and ethnology
- Awards: Cornplanter Medal
- Scientific career
- Fields: Linguistics; ethnography
- Workplaces: Bureau of Ethnology (Smithsonian Institution)

John Napoleon Brinton Hewitt (December 16, 1859 – October 14, 1937) was an American linguist and ethnographer who specialized in Iroquoian and other Native American languages. Hewitt was born on the Tuscarora Indian Reservation near Lewiston, New York. His parents were Harriet and David; his mother was of Tuscarora, French, Oneida, and Scottish descent, his father of English and Scottish, but raised in a Tuscarora family. His parents raised him speaking the English language, but when he left the reservation to attend schools in Wilson and Lockport, he learned to speak the Tuscarora language from other students who spoke the language.

In 1880, he was hired by Erminnie A. Smith of the Smithsonian Institution's Bureau of Ethnology (now the Bureau of American Ethnology), as an assistant ethnologist. He worked with Smith for several years until her death in 1886. He then applied to the institution for employment to complete the Tuscarora-English dictionary he had begun with Smith. He moved to Washington, D.C., where he would work as an ethnologist until his death. He worked on the dictionary throughout his life, but it was not published during his lifetime. (It was later edited and published as the Tuscarora-English/English-Tuscarora dictionary.)

In 1914 he was awarded the Cornplanter Medal.

Hewitt's prolific researches, including studies of Haudenosaunee mythology and language, were compiled in his well-known "Iroquois Cosmology" which was published in two parts, 1903 and 1928.

Hewitt died on October 14, 1937, at his home on East Capitol Street, Washington, D.C. He was buried in Rock Creek Cemetery.

== See also ==
- Arthur C. Parker
- Max Weber
- Orenda
