= Frontier House (Lewiston, New York) =

- U.S. National Register of Historic Places
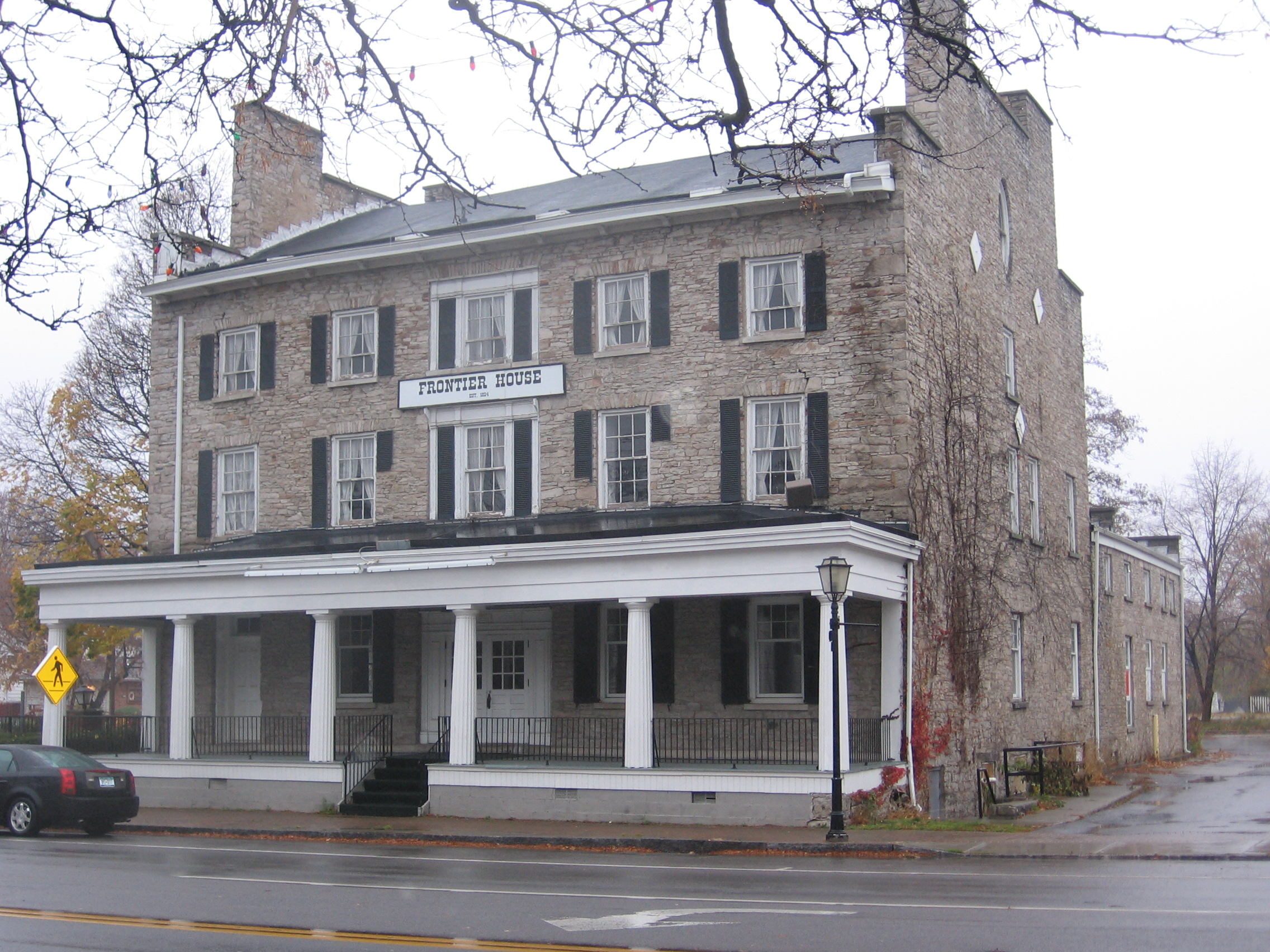
- The Frontier House facing the Niagara River

- Location within New York
- Location: 460 Center Street, Lewiston, New York
- Coordinates: 43°10′23″N 79°2′35″W
- Built: 1824
- NRHP reference No.: 74001278
- Added to NRHP: July 8, 1974

The Frontier House is a historic landmark in Lewiston, New York. In the early 1800s, it was known as the finest hotel in the United States west of Albany and housed several Niagara County businessmen and honored guests. The building has been on the National Register of Historic Places listings in Niagara County, New York since 1974. In addition to being a hotel, it has served as a private home, fine dining restaurant, museum, and McDonald's restaurant.

== Early history ==
The Frontier House, built in 1824, is situated at 460 Center Street, Lewiston, New York, of Niagara County and was hailed as the best hotel west of Albany. Prominent business men of Lewiston, Benjamin and Samuel Barton along with Joshua Fairbanks headed the building of the tavern.

The Frontier House was constructed of stone from the Bay of Quinte at the Northeastern end of Lake Ontario. 18 men worked 18 months in laying up the solid stone 30-inch walls. Fifteen fireplaces would keep visitors warm. Everyone in town could see the smoke billowing from the chimneys on the east and west side of the building. It was an imposing structure that fulfilled Benjamin Barton's expectations and was ready to house Gov. Dewitt Clinton and other state officials who came to Lewiston after the official opening of the Erie Canal in Lockport. When completed, the structure stood four stories tall. Its rectangular shape, double parallel chimneys, oval windows, full-width porch and hipped roof is characterized as the Federal style of architecture. Benjamin Barton's office was on the first floor with a large ballroom on the second floor. The third floor included fourteen bedrooms with fireplaces and the fourth floor was used for meetings, famously for free masons.

The structure was added to the National Register of Historic places on July 8, 1974.

== Guests ==
Dewitt Clinton, President William McKinley, Samuel Clemens, Charles Dickens, Henry Clay, Daniel Webster, John L. Sullivan and Jenny Lind were all honored guests of the Frontier House. In the 1800s ten coach trains arrived and departed from the Frontier House hotel daily carrying these among other influential people.

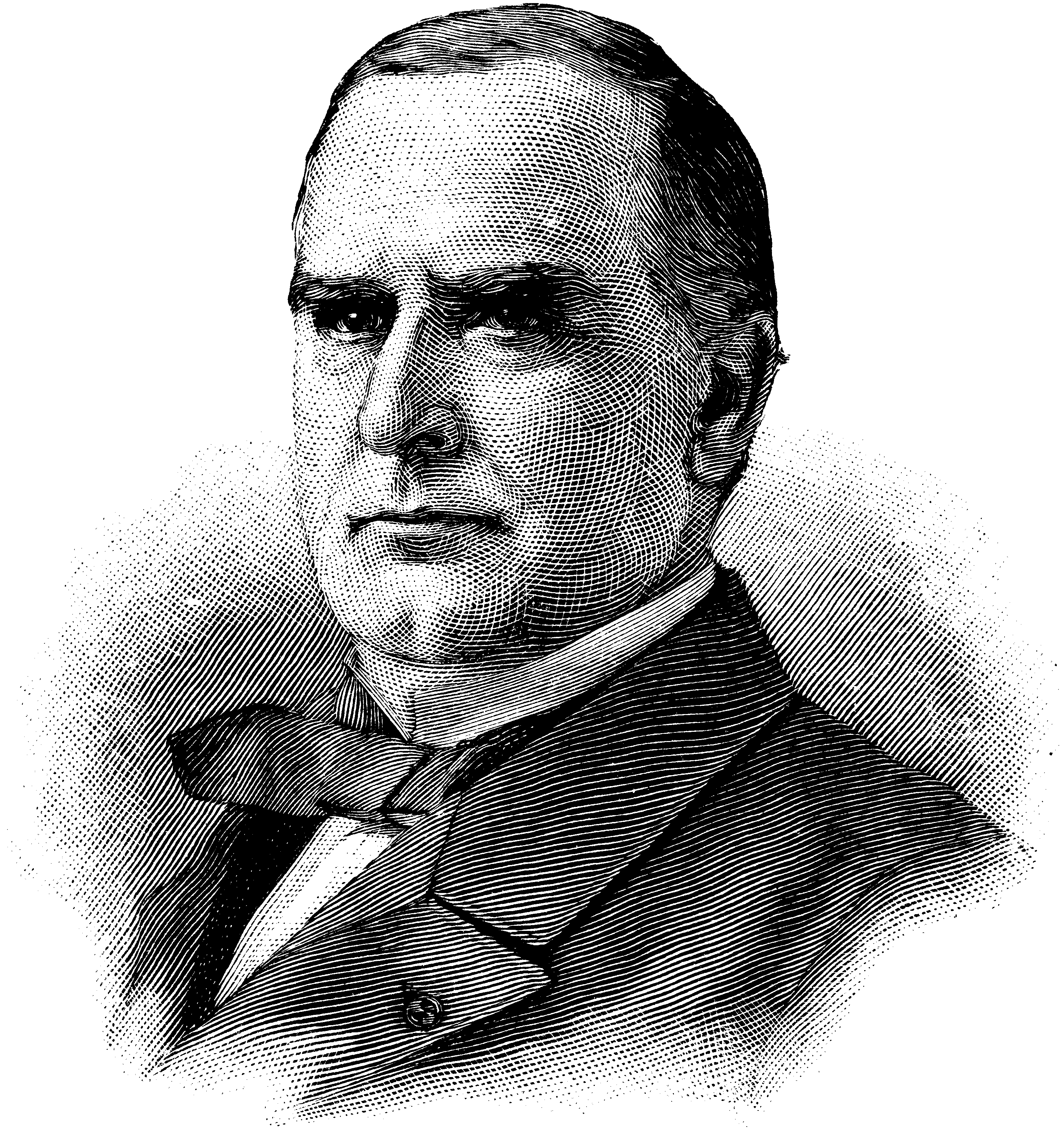
President William McKinley

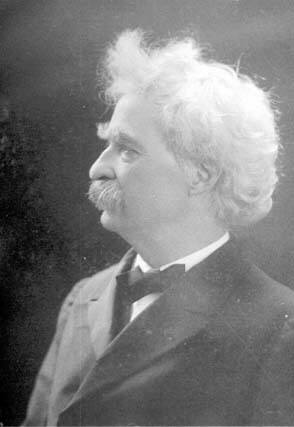
Mark Twain

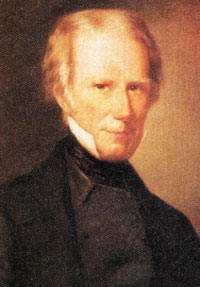
Henry Clay

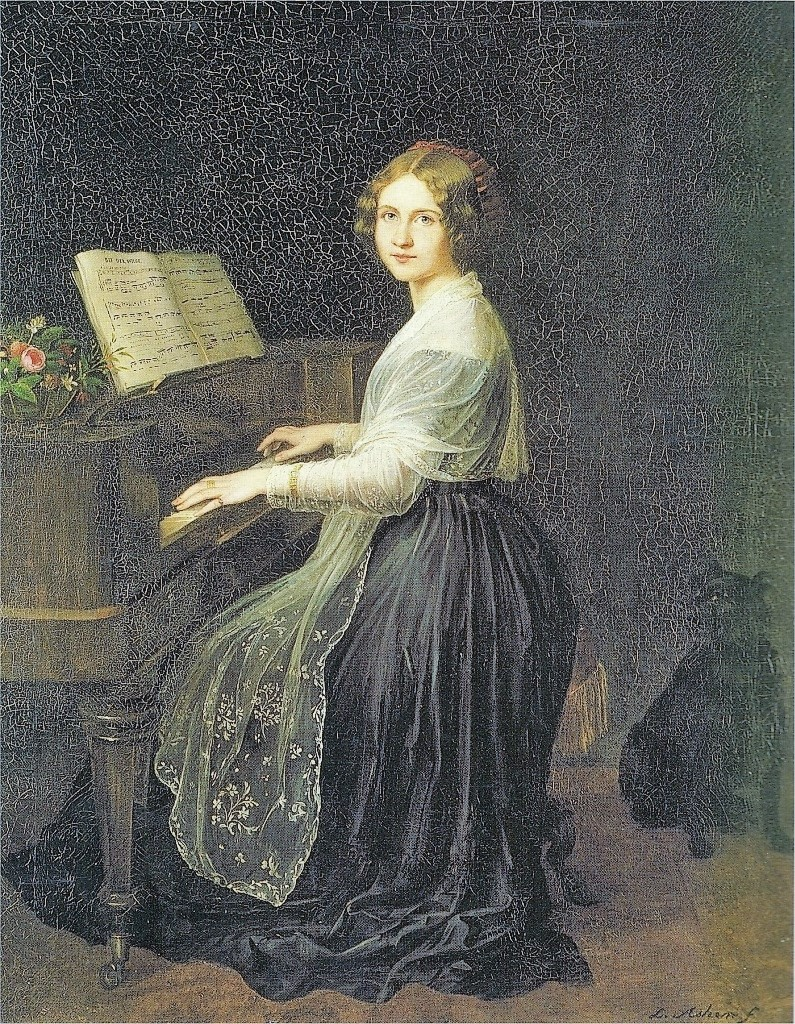
Opera star Jenny Lind, the "Swedish Nightingale"

== Ownership ==
The hotel was maintained by its descendants and later turned into a private home. George Rector purchased the inn and added the Frontier House Restaurant. Daughters of Rector inherited the hotel in the 1930s. In the economic boom of the 1960s area factories in Niagara Falls were welcoming newcomers at a rate of 11,000. The Frontier House rented its rooms to sleep three for each eight-hour shift because of the growing demand for housing. In June 1964, Mr. and Mrs. James Russell of Buffalo renovated the hotel into a museum and restaurant. Dining rooms, the Lafayette Ballroom was named on the second floor, a Victorian parlor and Early American bedroom styles were presented on the third floor and the fourth was private quarters. In September 1973, the manager and chef of Frontier House were rescued in a fire. One dining room was destroyed along with widespread water damage. Two years later the historic hotel of Lewiston's future was handed to William McDonald, who restored the interior and leased it to the McDonald's food chain. McDonald's closed in 2004, and the structure has been vacant ever since. It was acquired by the village of Lewiston in July 2013.

- 1819: Robert Troup owns property today known as 460 Center Street.
- 1824: Benjamin Barton, his son, Samuel and Joshua Fairbanks reach an agreement with Troup to begin constructing the Frontier House.
- 1825: The Frontier House opens the same year the Erie Canal begins service that switched commerce from Lewiston to Buffalo.
- 1826: William Morgan, the Masonic traitor, was kidnapped by Masons and brought the Frontier House. He was later transferred to Fort Niagara and disappeared.
- 1828: Benjamin Barton becomes owner of the Frontier House.
- 1843: Amos Tryon becomes owner.
- 1844 to 1963: Generations of the Raymond family own and operate the Frontier House.
- 1963: James Russell Smith buys the Frontier House and later renovates it.
- 1969: Louis Bolis, from Canada, buys the Frontier House. Local attorney, William McDonald, represents him.
- 1977: McDonald’s Corp. leases the property to operate the fast food franchise. Jorge Garzon is the first franchise owner. Frank Wasko is the manager.
- 2000: Richard Hastings buys the property for $270,000
- 2004: After 27 years, McDonald's closes operations at the site.
- 2018: Mayor Collesano and the Village Board sign an agreement to purchase the Frontier House for $800,000. A provision allows the Village to transfer the agreement to another buyer.
- 2019: Newly elected Mayor Anne Welch finds a private buyer and the agreement is transferred to a partnership of Jeff and Jerry Williams of Lewiston, and William Paladino of Buffalo. The bulk of the mortgage is financed by Lewiston resident, Bill Game.
- 2023: Developers announce $6 million project to fully restore the Frontier House with project completion scheduled for late 2023.

== Haunting accounts ==
The Frontier House of Lewiston is believed to be haunted by a bricklayer who opposed the Free Masons. William Morgan was kidnapped and held behind the house until he allegedly was imprisoned at Fort Niagara. Hotel employees claimed doors opened and closed voluntarily. Workers during the remodeling of the house for the McDonald's restaurant found tools and other equipment disappear before their eyes. Contractors heard strange sounds and windows opened. The ghost of an elderly man was purportedly seen in the pantry and an employee showering in the residence alleges to have seen the silhouette of a woman. There is a theory that while the structure was being built, one worker fell from the third floor into the basement and died. The legend says that two of his fellow workers stuffed him in a stone used to build the wall of the basement to cover up the evidence.

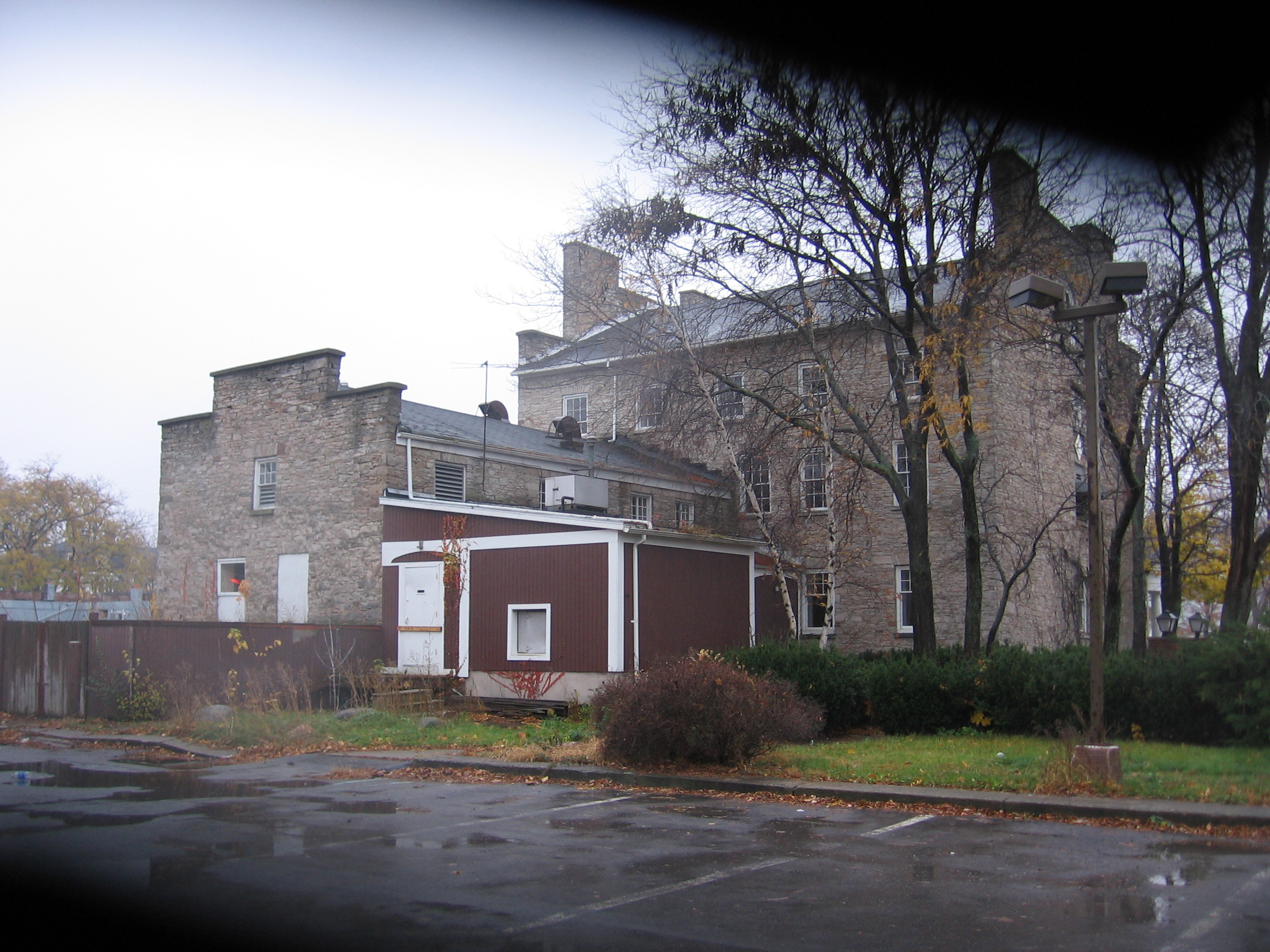
The rear of The Frontier House where William Morgan was believed to be shackled.

== Gallery ==
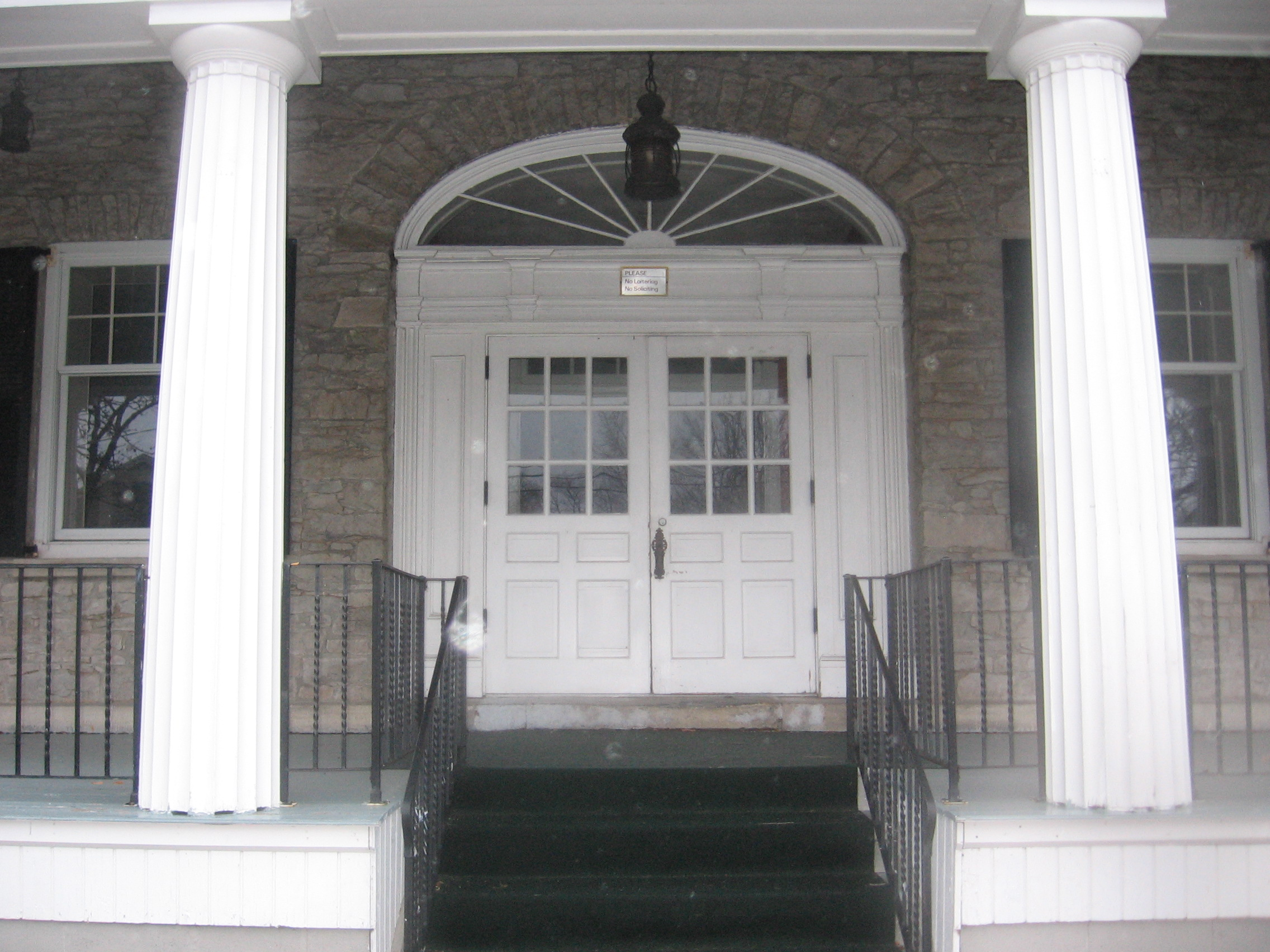
A federal fan-style window in the entrance of Frontier House.

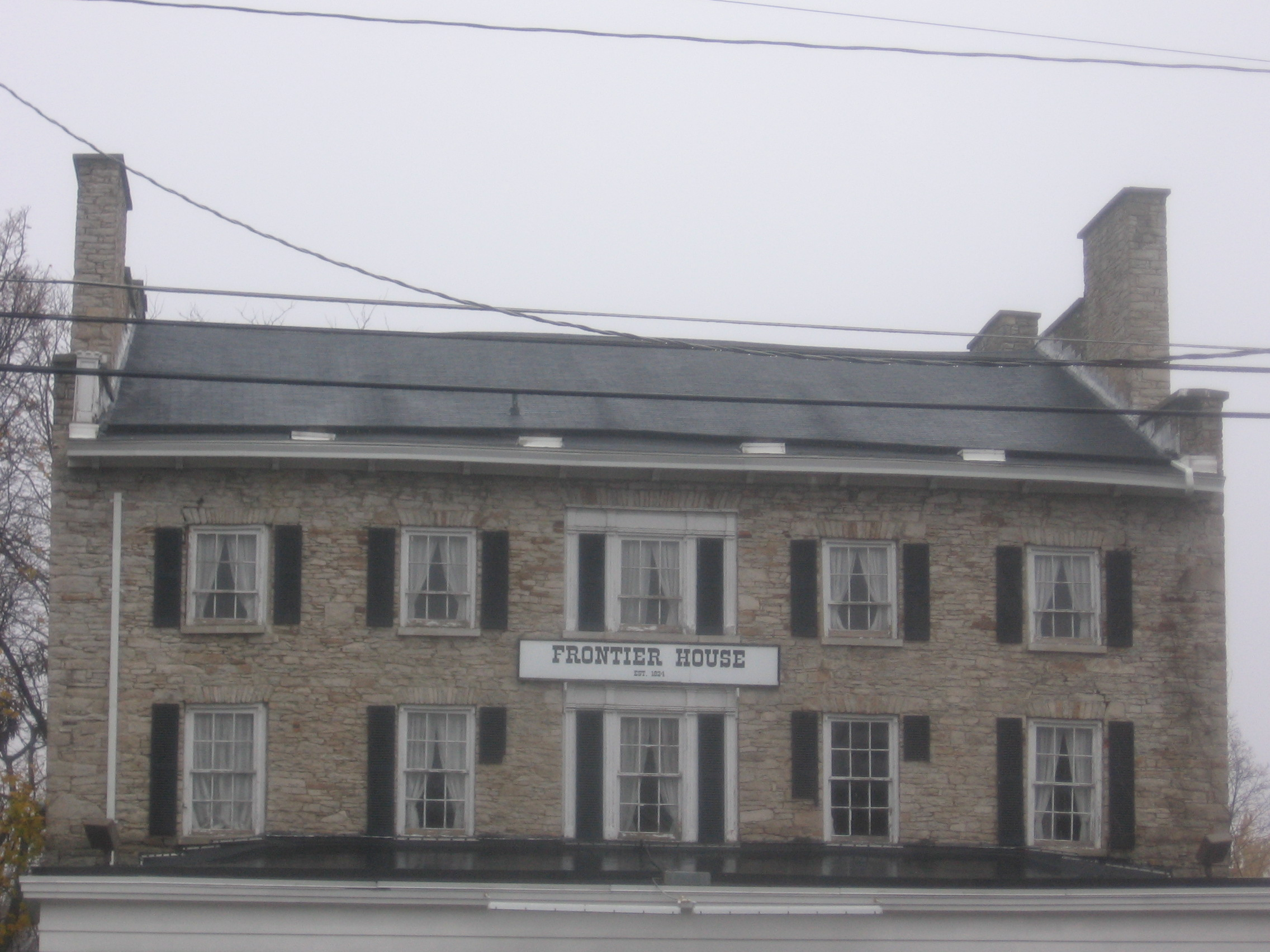
The double chimneys of the Federal-style hotel.

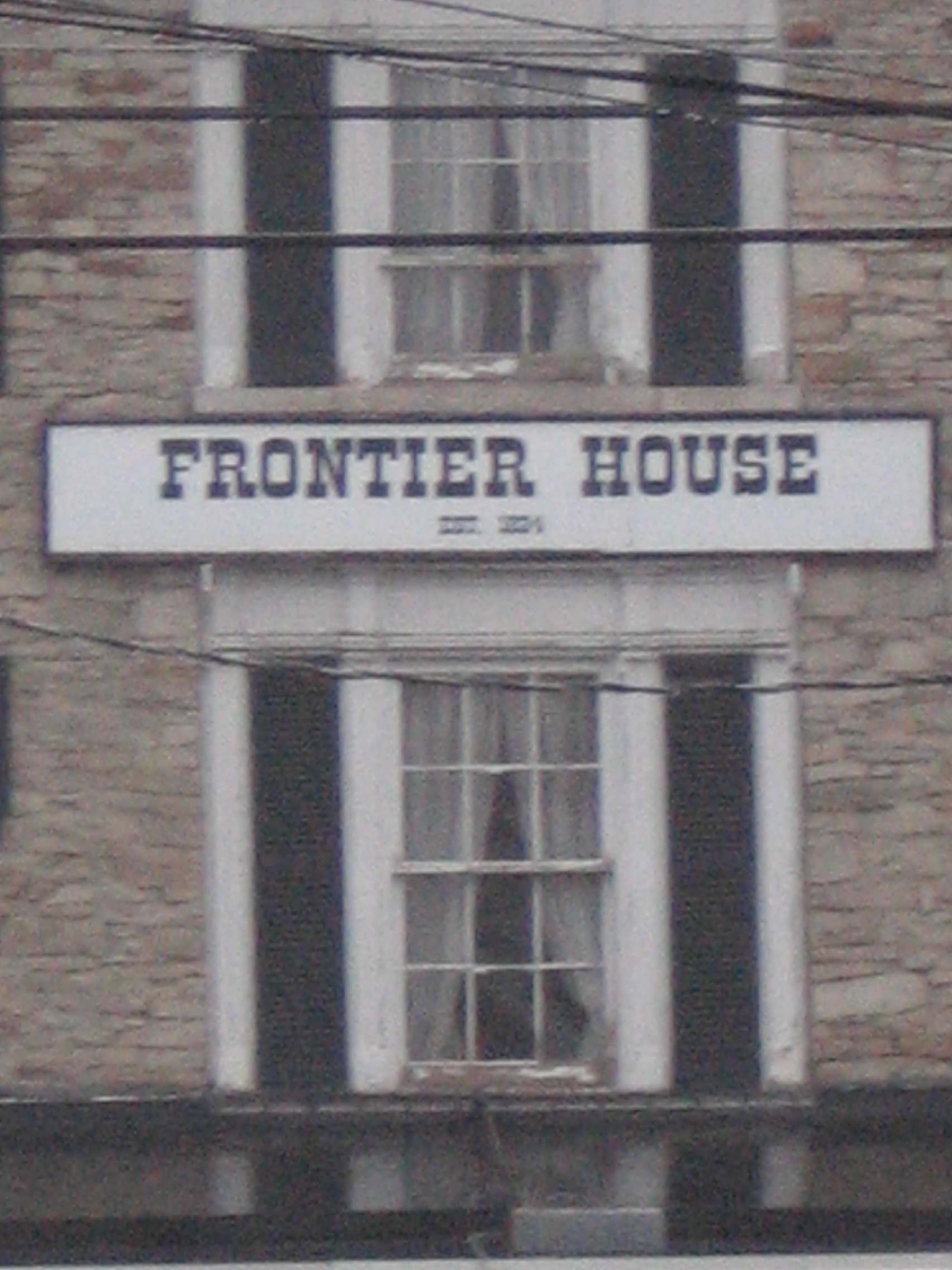
The official title of the house located between two windows on the front of the structure.

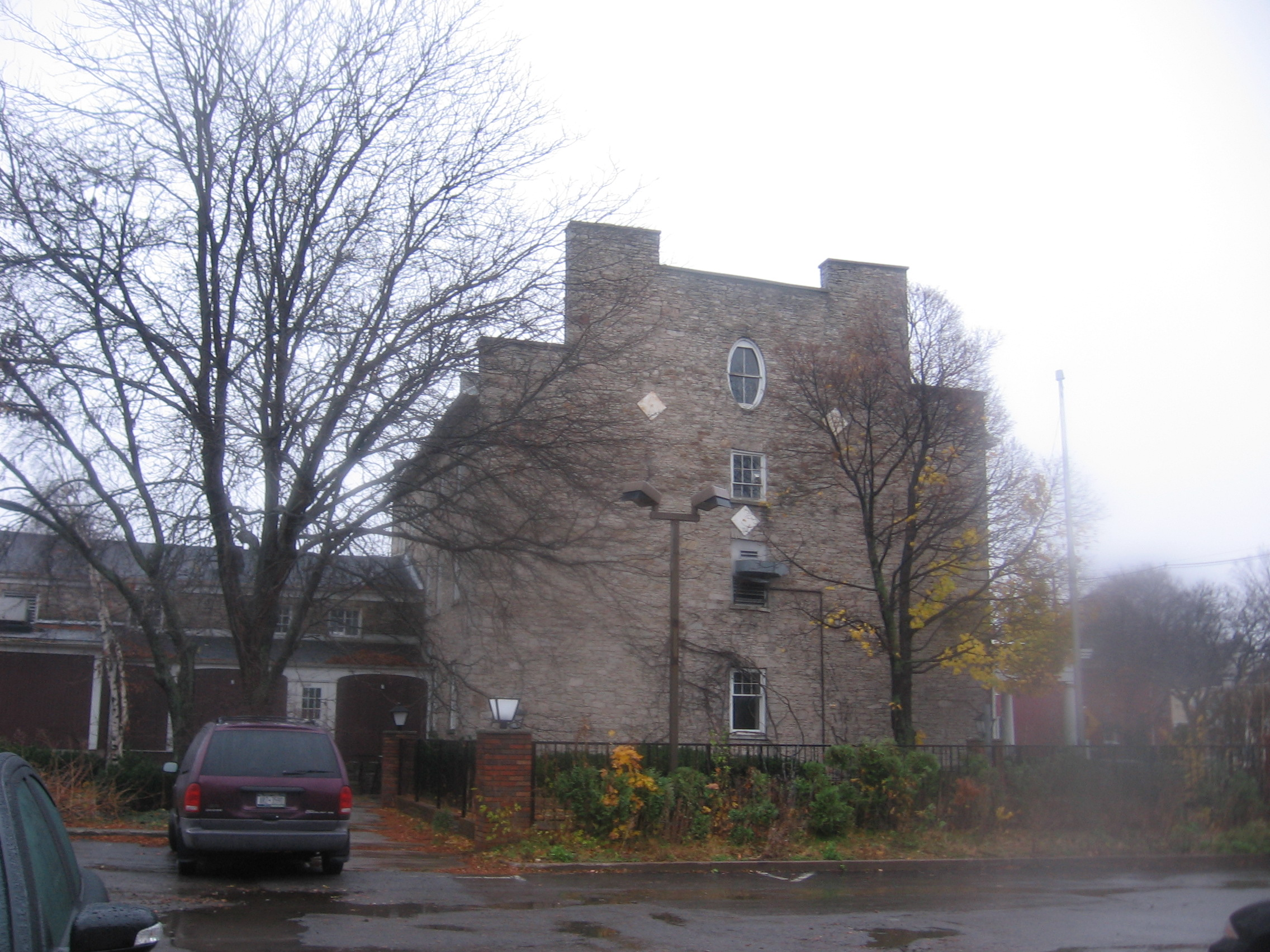
A view of the side of building including one of the double chimneys.
