= John Ceretto =

American politician

John D. Ceretto

Member of the New York State Assembly from the 145th district
- In office January 1, 2013 – December 31, 2016
- Preceded by: Mickey Kearns
- Succeeded by: Angelo Morinello

Member of the New York State Assembly from the 138th district
- In office January 1, 2011 – December 31, 2012
- Preceded by: Francine DelMonte
- Succeeded by: Harry B. Bronson

Personal details
- Born: May 12, 1952 (age 74) Niagara Falls, New York
- Party: Democratic Party (2015–present)
- Other political affiliations: Republican Party (2006–2015); Democratic Party (before 2006)
- Spouse: Beth
- Children: four
- Education: Niagara University
- Profession: politician
- Website: Official website

John D. Ceretto (born May 12, 1952) is an American politician and a former Democratic member of the New York State Assembly, representing the 145th Assembly District from 2011 to 2016. His district included the cities of Niagara Falls and Tonawanda also, the towns of Lewiston, Cambria, Niagara, Wheatfield, and Grand Island.

== Education and early career ==
A Niagara Falls native, he attended La Salle Senior High School and is a graduate of Niagara University with a Bachelors and a master's degree in Education and Administration. While still in college, he worked for the Carborundum Abrasive Company. Upon completing his education, he worked as a substitute teacher in many of the local schools and then worked for 20 years at the Tulip Corporation in Niagara Falls.

== Political career ==
In 1995, Ceretto was elected as a councilman on the Lewiston Town Board as a member of the Democratic Party. In 2005, he was elected Niagara County Legislator in the 12th District. Ceretto also served as Vice-Chairman of the Niagara County Economic Development Committee and Chairman of the Niagara County Refuse Department. In 2006, Ceretto changed his party affiliation, joining the Republican Party.

In the November 2010 election for State Assembly, Ceretto beat former Assemblywoman Francine DelMonte, who ran on the Working Families Party Line facing and Democratic challenger candidate and former Niagara Falls City Councilman John Accardo.

On August 18, 2015, Ceretto announced that he would run for reelection in 2016 as a Democrat. He was defeated that year by Republican Angelo Morinello.

== Personal life ==
Ceretto married his wife Beth in 1978. They reside in Lewiston, New York, with their four children. The middle child John D. Ceretto II is an assistant district attorney for Niagara County.

== See also ==
- List of people from Lewiston, New York

Political offices
Preceded by	Niagara County Legislator, 12th district January 1, 2006 – December 31, 2010	Succeeded by Richard E. Updegrove
New York State Assembly
Preceded by Francine DelMonte	New York State Assembly, 138th District; January 1, 2011 – December 31, 2012	Succeeded by Harry B. Bronson
Preceded by Michael P. Kearns	New York State Assembly, 145th District; January 1, 2013 – December 31, 2016	Succeeded by Angelo Morinello
