= Mana (Oceanic cultures) =

Life force energy, power, effectiveness, and prestige in Pacific Island culture

In Melanesian and Polynesian cultures, mana is a supernatural force that permeates the universe. Anyone or anything can have mana. It is believed to be a cultivation or possession of energy and power, rather than being a source of power. It is an intentional force.

Mana has been discussed mostly in relation to cultures of Polynesia, but also of Melanesia, notably the Solomon Islands and Vanuatu.

In the 19th century, scholars compared mana to concepts they believed to be similar, such as the orenda of the Haudenosaunee and theorized that mana was a universal phenomenon that explained the origin of religions. However, subsequent scholarship and Indigenous communities view these theories as inaccurate.

== Etymology ==
The reconstructed Proto-Oceanic word *mana is thought to have referred to "powerful forces of nature such as thunder and storm winds" rather than supernatural power. As the Oceanic-speaking peoples spread eastward, the word started to refer instead to unseen supernatural powers.

== Polynesian culture ==
Mana is a foundational element of Polynesian theology, a spiritual quality with a supernatural origin and a sacred, impersonal force. To have mana implies influence, authority, and efficacy: the ability to perform in a given situation. The quality of mana is not limited to individuals; peoples, governments, places, and inanimate objects may also possess mana, and its possessors are accorded respect. Mana protects its protector, and they depend on each other for growth, both positive and negative. It depends on the person where he takes his mana.

In Polynesia, mana was traditionally seen as a "transcendent power that blesses" that can "express itself directly" through various ways, but most often shows itself through the speech, movement, or traditional ritual of a "prophet, priest, or king".

=== Hawaiian and Tahitian culture ===
In Hawaiian and Tahitian culture, mana is a spiritual energy and healing power which can exist in places, objects, and persons. Hawaiians believe that mana may be gained or lost by actions, and Hawaiians and Tahitians believe that mana is both external and internal. Sites on the Hawaiian Islands and in French Polynesia are believed to possess mana—for example, the top rim of the Haleakalā volcano on the island of Maui and the Taputapuatea marae on the island of Raʻiātea in the Society Islands.

Ancient Hawaiians also believed that the island of Molokaʻi possessed mana compared with its neighboring islands. Before the unification of the Hawaiian Kingdom by King Kamehameha I, battles were fought for possession of the island and its south shore fish ponds, which existed until the late 19th century.

A person may gain mana by pono "right actions". In ancient Hawaii, there were two paths to mana: sexual means or violence. In at least this tradition, nature is seen as dualistic, and everything has a counterpart. A balance between the gods Kū and Lono formed, through whom are the two paths to mana (ʻimihaku, or the search for mana). Kū, the god of war and politics, offers mana through violence; this was how Kamehameha gained his mana. Lono, the god of peace and fertility, offers mana through sexuality. Prayers were believed to have mana, which was sent to the akua at the end when the priest usually said "amama ua noa", meaning "the prayer is now free or flown".

=== Māori culture ===
==== Māori use ====
In the Māori culture of New Zealand, there are two essential aspects of a person's mana: mana tangata, authority derived from whakapapa (genealogy) and mana huaanga, defined as "authority derived from having a wealth of resources to gift to others to bind them into reciprocal obligations". Hemopereki Simon, from Ngāti Tūwharetoa, asserts that there are many forms of mana in Māori beliefs. The indigenous word reflects a non-Western view of reality, complicating translation. This is confirmed by the definition of mana provided by Māori Marsden who states that mana is:

Spiritual power and authority as opposed to the purely psychic and natural force — ihi.

According to Margaret Mutu, mana in its traditional sense means:

Power, authority, ownership, status, influence, dignity, respect derived from the atua.

In terms of leadership, Ngāti Kahungunu legal scholar Carwyn Jones comments: "Mana is the central concept that underlies Māori leadership and accountability." He also considers mana as a fundamental aspect of the constitutional traditions of Māori society.

According to the New Zealand Ministry of Justice:

Mana and tapu are concepts which have both been attributed single-worded definitions by contemporary writers. As concepts, especially Maori concepts they can not easily be translated into a single English definition. Both mana and tapu take on a whole range of related meanings depending on their association and the context in which they are being used.

A tribe with mana whenua must have demonstrated their authority over a territory.

==== General English usage ====
In contemporary New Zealand English, the word "mana" refers to a person or organisation of people of great personal prestige and character.

== Academic study ==
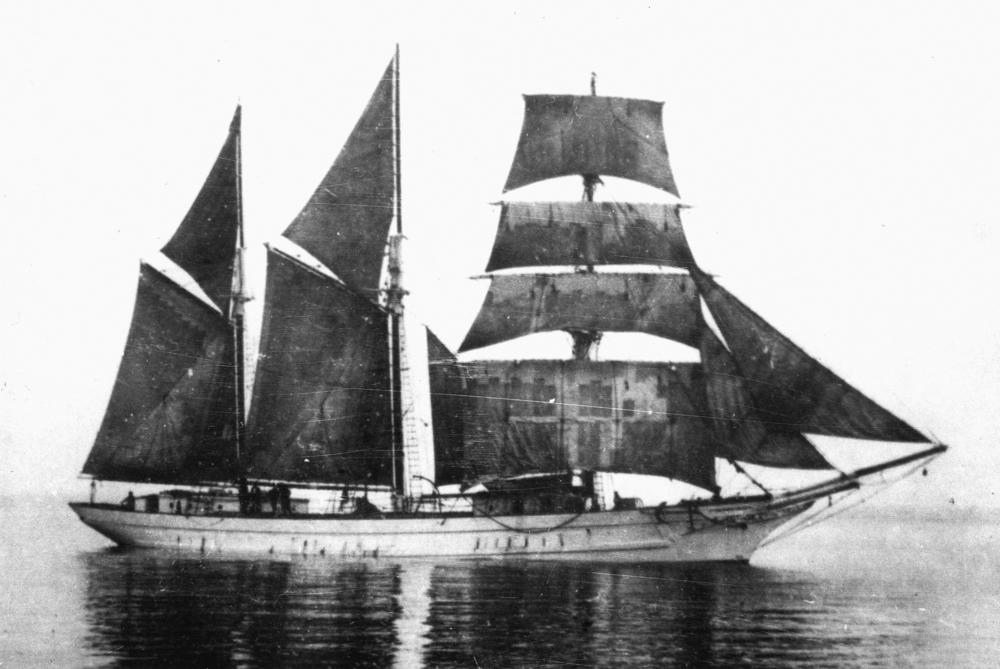
The 1891 Southern Cross, one of the ships at Norfolk Island's Melanesian Mission where Codrington taught and worked

Missionary Robert Henry Codrington traveled widely in Melanesia, publishing several studies of its language and culture. His 1891 book The Melanesians: Studies in their Anthropology and Folk-Lore contains the first detailed description of mana in English. Codrington defines it as "a force altogether distinct from physical power, which acts in all kinds of ways for good and evil, and which it is of the greatest advantage to possess or control".

=== Pre-animism ===
Describing pre-animism, Robert Ranulph Marett cited the Melanesian mana (primarily with Codrington's work): "When the science of Comparative Religion employs a native expression such as mana, it is obliged to disregard to some extent its original or local meaning. Science, then, may adopt mana as a general category". In Melanesia, "animae" are the souls of living men, the ghosts of deceased men, and spirits "of ghost-like appearance" or imitating living people. Spirits can inhabit other objects, such as animals or stones.

The most significant property of mana is that it is distinct from, and exists independently of, its source. Animae act only through mana. It is impersonal, undistinguished, and (like energy) transmissible between objects, which can have more or less of it. Mana is perceptible, appearing as a "Power of awfulness" (in the sense of awe or wonder). Objects possessing it impress an observer with "respect, veneration, propitiation, service" emanating from the mana's power. Marett lists several objects habitually possessing mana: "startling manifestations of nature", "curious stones", animals, "human remains", blood, thunderstorms, eclipses, eruptions, glaciers, and the sound of a bullroarer.

If mana is a distinct power, it may be treated distinctly. Marett distinguishes spells, which treat mana quasi-objectively, and prayers, which address the animae. An anima may have departed, leaving mana in the form of a spell which can be addressed by magic. Although Marett postulates an earlier pre-animistic phase, a "rudimentary religion" or "magico-religious" phase in which the mana figures without animae, "no island of pure 'pre-animism' is to be found". Like Tylor, he theorizes a thread of commonality between animism and pre-animism identified with the supernatural—the "mysterious", as opposed to the reasonable.

=== Durkheim's totemism ===
In 1912, French sociologist Émile Durkheim examined totemism, the religion of the Aboriginal Australians, from a sociological and theological point of view, describing collective effervescence as originating in the idea of the totemic principle or mana.

=== Criticism ===
In 1936, Ian Hogbin criticised the universality of Marett's pre-animism: "Mana is by no means universal and, consequently, to adopt it as a basis on which to build up a general theory of primitive religion is not only erroneous but indeed fallacious". However, Marett intended the concept as an abstraction. Spells, for example, may be found "from Central Australia to Scotland".

Early 20th-century scholars also saw mana as a universal concept, found in all human cultures and expressing fundamental human awareness of a sacred life energy. In his 1904 essay, "Outline of a General Theory of Magic", Marcel Mauss drew on the writings of Codrington and others to paint a picture of mana as "power par excellence, the genuine effectiveness of things which corroborates their practical actions without annihilating them". Mauss pointed out the similarity of mana to the Haudenosaunee orenda and the Algonquian manitou, convinced of the "universality of the institution"; "a concept, encompassing the idea of magical power, was once found everywhere".

Mauss and his collaborator, Henri Hubert, were criticised for this position when their 1904 Outline of a General Theory of Magic was published. "No one questioned the existence of the notion of mana", wrote Mauss's biographer Marcel Fournier, "but Hubert and Mauss were criticized for giving it a universal dimension". Criticism of mana as an archetype of life energy increased. According to Mircea Eliade, the idea of mana is not universal; in places where it is believed, not everyone has it, and "even among the varying formulae (mana, wakan, orenda, etc.) there are, if not glaring differences, certainly nuances not sufficiently observed in the early studies". "With regard to these theories founded upon the primordial and universal character of mana, we must say without delay that they have been invalidated by later research".

Holbraad argued in a paper included in the volume Thinking Through Things: Theorising Artefacts Ethnographically that the concept of mana highlights a significant theoretical assumption in anthropology: that matter and meaning are separate. A hotly debated issue, Holbraad suggests that mana provides motive to re-evaluate the division assumed between matter and meaning in social research. His work is part of the ontological turn in anthropology, a paradigm shift that aims to take seriously the ontology of other cultures.

== See also ==
- Aṣẹ
- Barakah
- Chakra
- Charm
- The Force
- Guṇa
- Kami in Shinto
- Manitou
- Melanesian mythology
- Mysticism
- Occult
- Philippine shamans or Babaylan
- Prana
- Qi or Chi
- Quintessence or Aether
- Ritual
- Scientific skepticism
- Taboo
- Talisman
- Väki
- Wind Horse
- Yorishiro in Shinto
