= Tuscarora Reservation =

Indian reservation in New York, United States

Coordinates: 43°09′59″N 78°57′26″W

Tuscarora Reservation Nyučirhéˀę (Tuscarora)
- Indian reservation
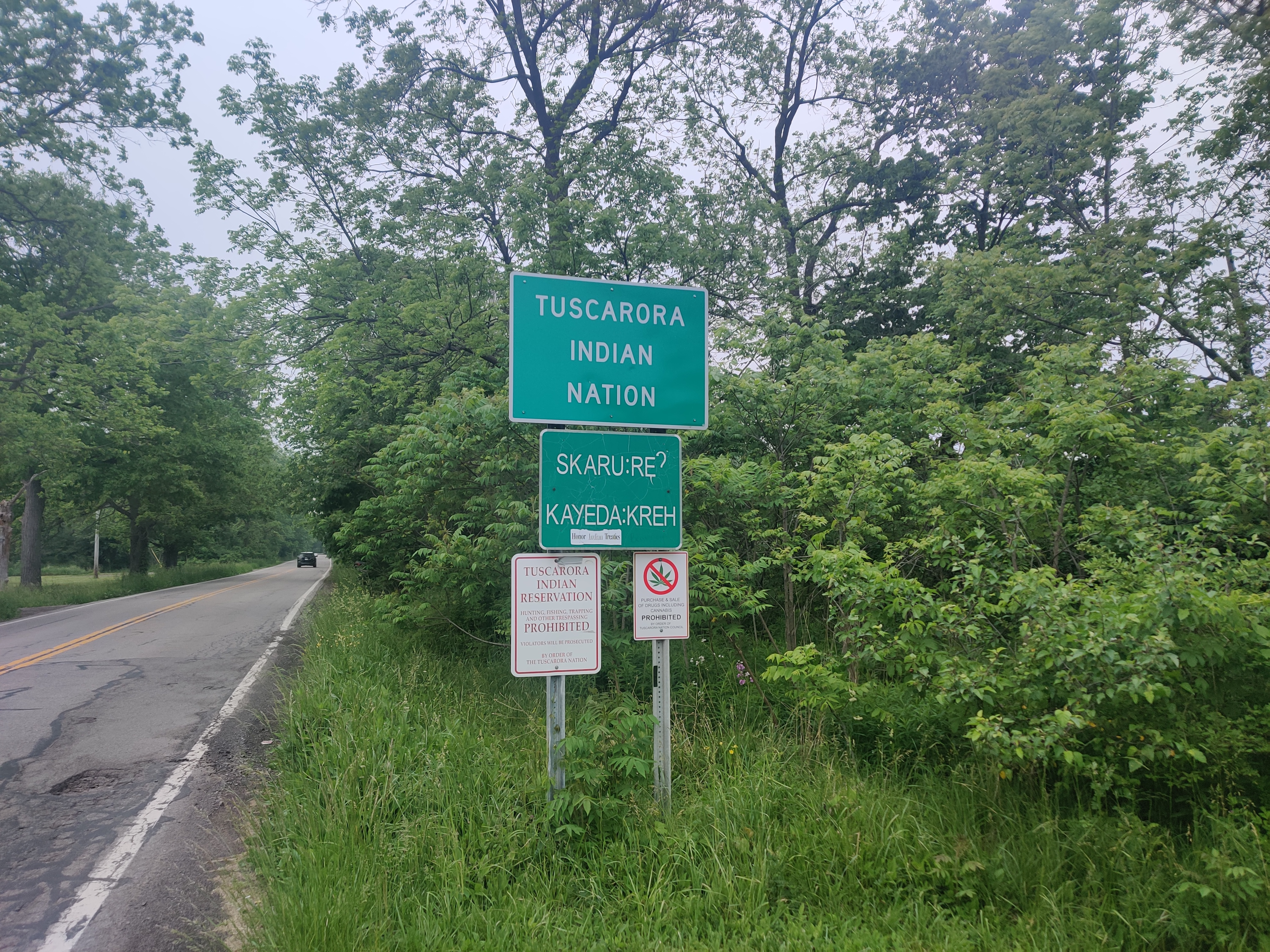
- Entrance to reservation on Walmore Road next to Smokin Joes Trading Post

- Location of Tuscarora Reservation in red, within Niagara County, New York
- Country: United States
- State: New York
- Counties: Niagara

Area
  - Total: 9.3 sq mi (24.1 km^{2})
  - Land: 9.3 sq mi (24.0 km^{2})
  - Water: 0.039 sq mi (0.1 km^{2})

Population (2020)
  - Total: 1,152
  - Density: 124/sq mi (48.0/km^{2})
- Time zone: UTC-5 (Eastern (EST))
  - Summer (DST): UTC-4 (EDT)

The Tuscarora Reservation (Tuscarora: Nyučirhéˀę) is an Indian reservation of the Tuscarora Nation in Niagara County, New York. The reservation population was 1,152 at the 2010 census.

== History ==
=== 18th century ===
After an extended conflict with European settlers and other Native Americans at the beginning of the 18th century and defeat in the Tuscarora War, most of the Tuscarora people migrated to the territory of the Haudenosaunee, beginning in 1722, where they were taken under the protection of the Oneida people.

The Tuscarora and Oneida became allies of the American Continental cause during the American Revolution, and of the United States during the War of 1812. During both wars, they suffered attacks by British armed forces and their Indigenous allies in Central New York. In 1797, the Tuscarora were given land from the Seneca tribe (territory which they had taken from the Neutral Nation in the Beaver Wars of the mid-17th century).

=== 19th century ===
In 1803, the US government granted the Tuscarora a reservation in Niagara County.

University at Buffalo head football coach Frank Mount Pleasant was born on the reservation in 1884.

=== 20th century ===
In 1960, through the efforts of the powerful appointed official, Robert Moses of New York City, New York State seized 550 acres (2.2 km^{2}) of the Tuscarora reservation to form a reservoir for the Robert Moses Niagara Power Plant operated by the New York Power Authority. New York needed 1,350 acres (5.5 km^{2}) but only received 550 acres (2.2 km^{2}) and had to pay $1,500 per acre per a United States Supreme Court Decision. This led to a displacement of tribal members and a serious disruption to their economy. After a lengthy court case and appeals, in 2003, the Power Authority agreed to compensate the tribe financially and return some unused land.

=== 21st century ===
On October 26, 2019, it was reported that a Niagara Power Project lost more than 600 acres when Robert Moses flooded the land to create a reservoir. From that time on the Reservation experienced and continues to experience a water shortage with the reservation now sitting on top of the highest point in Niagara. "In 2012, 14 out of 15 wells tested positive for lead; 139 wells were tested for harmful bacteria and 69% tested positive for Total Coliforms, while 22% came back positive for E. coli."

== Geography ==
According to the United States Census Bureau, the Indian reservation has a total area of 9.3 mi^{2} (24.0 km^{2}), all land. The reservation is located northeast of Niagara Falls, New York. It is surrounded by the Town of Lewiston. The reservation is a composite holding derived from (1) land given to the Seneca tribe, (2) Land donated by the Holland Land Company, and (3) Trust territory held by the federal government.

== Demographics ==
Historical population
Census	Pop.	Note	%±
1900	337		—
1910	417		23.7%
1920	319		−23.5%
1930	402		26.0%
1940	462		14.9%
1950	634		37.2%
1960	1,934		205.0%
1970	1,134		−41.4%
1980	921		−18.8%
1990	772		−16.2%
2000	1,138		47.4%
2010	1,152		1.2%
2014 (est.)	1,149		−0.3%
U.S. Decennial Census

As of the census of 2000, there were 1,138 people, 398 households, and 284 families residing in the Indian reservation. The population density was 122.8/mi^{2} (47.4/km^{2}). There were 398 housing units at an average density of 42.9/mi^{2} (16.6/km^{2}).

There were 398 households, out of which 43.2% had children under the age of 18 living with them, 45.5% were married couples living together, 19.3% had a female householder with no husband present, and 28.4% were non-families. 21.1% of all households were made up of individuals, and 5.5% had someone living alone who was 65 years of age or older. The average household size was 2.86 and the average family size was 3.36.

In the Indian reservation the population was spread out, with 34.3% under the age of 18, 13.7% from 18 to 24, 30.0% from 25 to 44, 14.3% from 45 to 64, and 7.7% who were 65 years of age or older. The median age was 26 years. For every 100 females there were 104.7 males. For every 100 females age 18 and over, there were 97.4 males.

The median income for a household in the Indian reservation was $32,500, and the median income for a family was $38,333. Males had a median income of $33,281 versus $25,074 for females. The per capita income for the Indian reservation was $14,427. About 9.9% of families and 13.0% of the population were below the poverty line, including 13.4% of those under age 18 and 9.6% of those age 65 or over.
