= History of Pennsylvania =

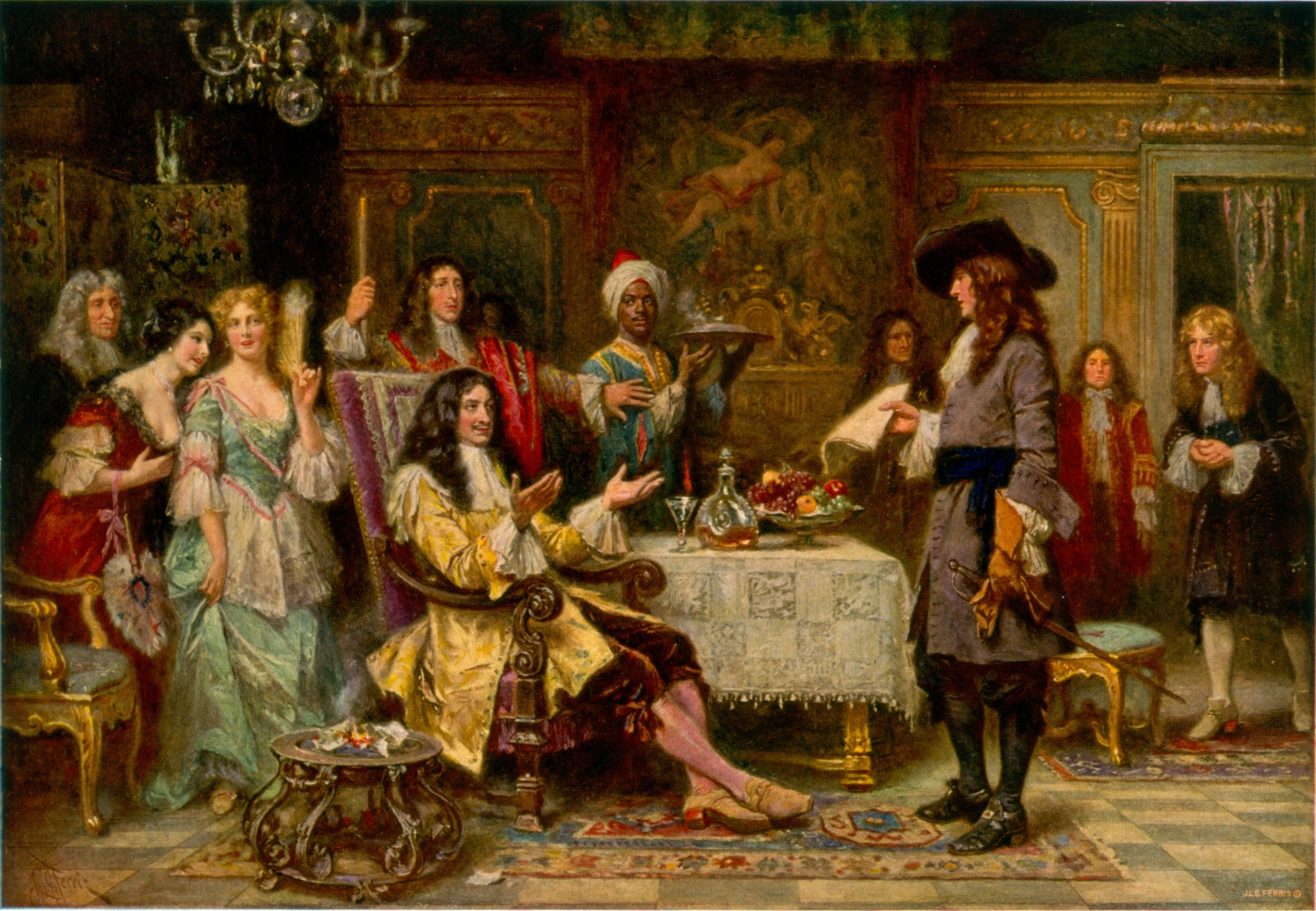
The Birth of Pennsylvania, a portrait of William Penn (standing with document in hand), who founded the Province of Pennsylvania in 1681 as a refuge for Quakers after receiving a royal deed to it from King Charles II

The history of Pennsylvania is traceable to the first modern indigenous peoples that occupied the area of present-day Pennsylvania. These included the Lenape, Susquehannocks, Haudenosaunee, Erie, Massawomeck, Shawnee and other Native American tribes.

In the early 17th century the area on the east side of the Delaware River was claimed by both the Dutch and the Swedes. Dutch presence was limited to Fort Beversreede, a trading post located in present-day Philadelphia. The Dutch abandoned the fort in 1651 due to Swedish encroachment. In 1655, the Swedes surrendered control of the area to New Netherland, but in 1664 the Dutch surrendered New Netherland to the British. In 1681, Pennsylvania became a British colony when William Penn received a royal deed from King Charles II of England.

Penn, a Quaker, established his colony based on religious tolerance. It was settled by many Quakers along with Philadelphia, its largest city, which was also the first planned city. In the mid-1700s, the colony attracted many German and Scots-Irish immigrants. Most of the Indigenous tribes were driven off or reduced to remnants as a result of diseases, such as smallpox.

While each of the Thirteen Colonies contributed to the American Revolution, Pennsylvania, and especially Philadelphia, was a center for the early planning and eventual launch of rebellion against King George III and the Kingdom of Great Britain, which was then the most powerful political and military empire in the world.

Philadelphia served as the capital of the new United States between New York City and the establishment of Washington, D.C.. During the 19th century, Pennsylvania established its northwestern, northeastern, and southwestern borders, and Pittsburgh emerged as one of the nation's largest and most prominent cities of the day. The state played an important role in the Union's victory in the American Civil War. Following the war, Pennsylvania grew into a Republican political stronghold and a major manufacturing and transportation center.

During the 20th century, following the Great Depression in the 1930s and World War II in the 1940s, Pennsylvania moved away from being dominated by industry and farming and towards the service and financial sectors economically and became a swing state politically.

== Native Americans ==
Pennsylvania's history of human habitation extends to thousands of years before the foundation of the Province of Pennsylvania. Archaeologists generally argue that the first settlement of the Americas occurred at least 15,000 years ago during the last glacial period, though it is unclear when humans first entered present-day Pennsylvania. There is an open debate in the archaeological community regarding when the ancestors of Native Americans expanded across the two continents to the tip of South America, with the range of estimates being between 30,000 and 10,500 years ago. The Meadowcroft Rockshelter contains the earliest known signs of human activity in Pennsylvania, and perhaps all of North America, as it contains the remains from over 10,000 years ago and possibly pre-dated the Clovis culture. By 1000 C.E., in contrast to their hunter-gatherer ancestors, the native population of Pennsylvania had developed agriculture and a mixed food economy. Pennsylvania later went through what's called the Archaic period. This period culminated in the Woodland period and the massive cross-woodland Hopewell exchange network.

Sources for Pennsylvania's prehistory come from a mix of oral history and archaeology, which pushes the known record back another 500 years or so. The Haudenosaunee called some of the previous inhabitants of the region the Alligewi (better written Adegowe). It is said that this is where the term Allegheny comes from (Adegoweni). Many groups of migrating Iroquoians moved through the region over the course of history. The shores of Lake Erie were inhabited by the Erie. An offshoot of them are called the Massawomeck crossed the Ohio and were the Monongahela culture, but later merged with the Susquehannocks due to warfare with the Haudenosaunee. The Monongahela were moundbuilders and built stone mounds like some of their neighbors to the south. They were part of the likely multiethnic Fort Ancient culture. The Suquehanna river watershed was inhabited by a variety of groups many of which are scarcely attested such as the Scahentoarrhonon, Tehotitachsae, Akhrakouaeronon and Juniata. The Scahentoarrhonon lived in the Wyoming valley and their country was called by other Iroquoians, Scahentowanen. To their south was the most powerful nation of the watershed the Susqueuhannock, many of the previously mentioned nations may have been subgroups or close relatives of the Susquehannock. Finally the Delaware river watershed was inhabited by the Lenape, they call their country Lenapehoking. Later many more nations moved into the region due to colonialism and associated warfare such as the Shawnee, Cherokee, Mohicans, Wyandot, Piscataway, Tutelo, Saponi and Nanticoke.

Disease, mass settlement, land seziures and constant warfare to fulfill european economic demands weakened many of these nations. Many of the Algonquian peoples on the east coast were forced to flee into Pennsylvania to receive the protection of the powerful Haudenosaunee confederacy. As they lost numbers and land, they abandoned much of their western territory and moved closer to the Susquehanna River and the Iroquois and Mohawk to the north. Northwest of the Allegheny River was the Iroquoian Erie, They were fragmented during the Beaver Wars and fled further south becoming what Europeans called the Westo.

A people known as the Trokwae were said to have settled by the westernmost Susquehannocks along the Ohio River. They may be the same as the Tockwogh, a small algonquian tribe from the Delmarva Peninsula (In many surviving Iroquoian languages, 'r' is silent.) previously long allied to the Susquehannock. They, however, did not survive the Beaver Wars. After their war with the Susquehannocks ended in the 1670s, they pushed straight south from New York and began attacking other tribes of Virginia. In the end, the French pushed the Iroquois back to the Ohio-Pennsylvania border, where they were finally convinced to sign a peace treaty in 1701. They sold off much of their remaining, extended lands to the English, but kept a large section along the Susquahanna River for themselves, they allowed refugees of other tribes to settle in towns, such as Shamokin, Lenape, Tutelo, Saponi, Piscataway, and Nanticoke. In the 1750s, the refugee tribes were relocated to New York, where they were roughly reorganized along cultural lines into three new Tutelo, Delaware and Nanticoke daughter nations of the Haudenosaunee Confederacy.

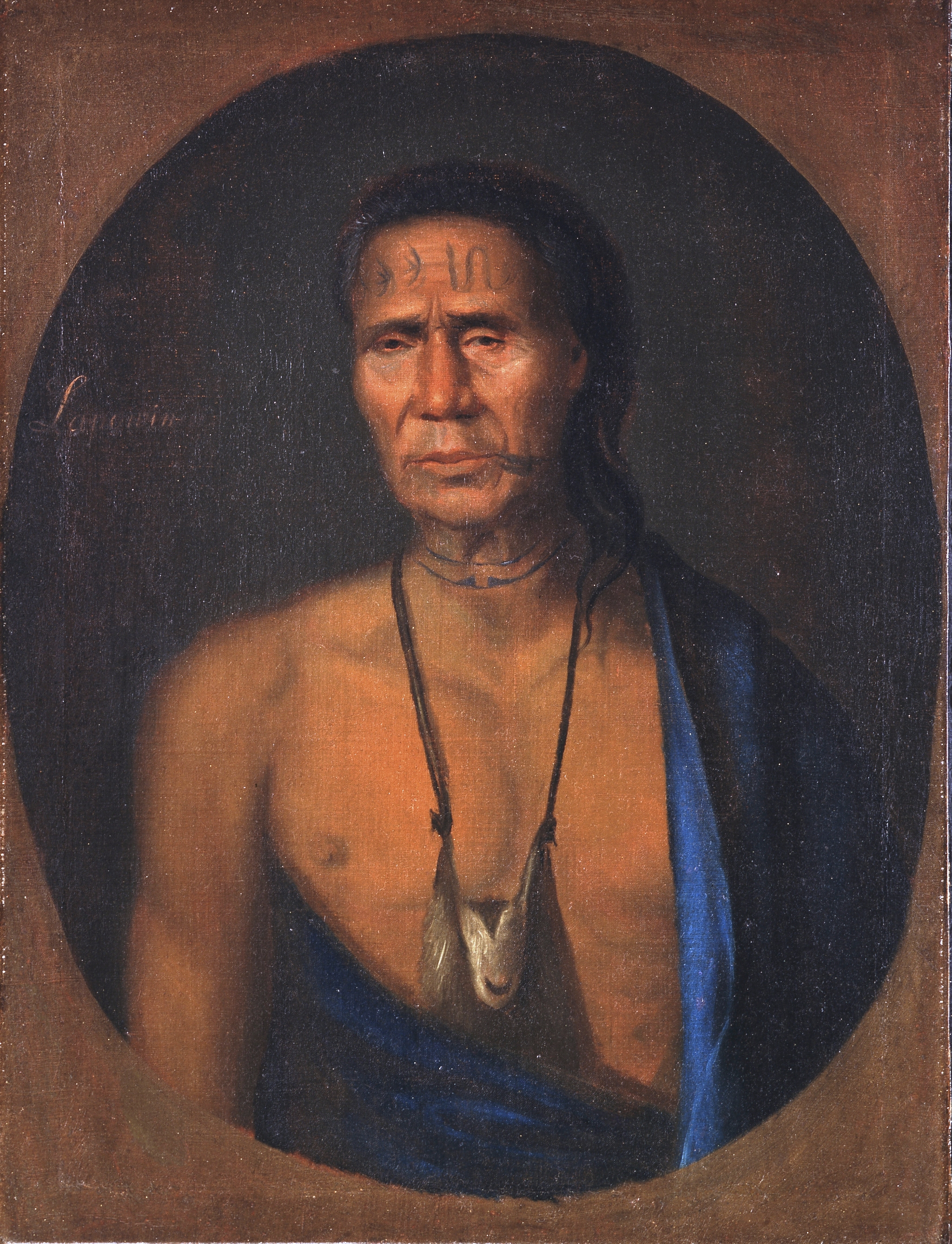
Lenape chief Lappawinsoe, depicted in a 1735 painting by Gustavus Hesselius

== European colonization ==
=== European colonization ===
A map of New Netherland (in magenta) and New Sweden (in blue) in the 17th century. New Sweden was later absorbed by New Netherland and then the British in the Second Anglo-Dutch War.

Long-term European exploration of the Americas commenced after the 1492 expedition of Christopher Columbus, and the 1497 expedition of John Cabot is credited with discovering continental North America for Europeans. European exploration of North America continued in the 16th century, and the area now known as Pennsylvania was mapped by the French and labeled L'arcadia, or "wooded coast", during Giovanni da Verrazzano's voyage in 1524. Even before large-scale European settlement, the Native American tribes in Pennsylvania engaged in trade with Europeans, and the fur trade was a major motivation for the European colonization of North America. The fur trade also sparked wars among Native American tribes, including the Beaver Wars, which saw the Iroquois Confederacy rise in power. In the 17th century, the Dutch, Swedish, and British all competed for southeastern Pennsylvania, while the French expanded into parts of western Pennsylvania.

In 1638, the Kingdom of Sweden, then one of the great powers in Europe, established the colony of New Sweden in the area of the present-day Mid-Atlantic states. The colony was established by Peter Minuit, the former governor of New Netherland, who established the fur trading colony over the objections of the Dutch. New Sweden was centered on the Delaware River with a capital at Fort Christina (near Wilmington, Delaware), and extended into very southeasternmost modern-day Pennsylvania. In 1643, New Sweden Governor Johan Björnsson Printz established Fort Nya Gothenburg, the first European settlement in Pennsylvania, on Tinicum Island. Printz also built his own home, The Printzhof, on the island.

In 1609, the Dutch Republic, in the midst of the Dutch Golden Age, commissioned Henry Hudson to explore North America. Shortly thereafter, the Dutch established the colony of New Netherland to profit from the North American fur trade. In 1655, during the Second Northern War, the Dutch under Peter Stuyvesant captured New Sweden. Although Sweden never again controlled land in the area, several Swedish and Finnish colonists remained, and with their influence came America's first log cabins.

The Kingdom of England had established the Colony of Virginia in 1607 and the adjacent Maryland Palatinate in 1632. England also claimed the Delaware River watershed based on the explorations of John Cabot, John Smith, and Francis Drake. The English named the Delaware River for Thomas West, 3rd Baron De La Warr, the Governor of the Virginia colony from 1610 until 1618. During the Second Anglo-Dutch War (1665–1667), the English took control of the Dutch (and former Swedish) holdings in North America. At the end of the Third Anglo-Dutch War, the 1674 Treaty of Westminster permanently confirmed England's control of the region.

Following the voyages of Giovanni da Verrazzano and Jacques Cartier, the French established a permanent colony in New France in the 17th century to exploit the North American fur trade. During the 16th, 17th, and 18th centuries, the French expanded New France across present day Eastern Canada into the Great Lakes region, and colonized the areas around the Mississippi River as well. New France expanded into western Pennsylvania by the 18th century, as the French built Fort Duquesne to defend the Ohio River valley. With the end of the Swedish and Dutch colonies, the French were the last rivals to the British for control of the region that would become Pennsylvania. France was often allied with Spain, the only other remaining European power with holdings in continental North America. Beginning in 1688 with King William's War (part of the Nine Years' War), France and England engaged in a series of wars for dominance over Northern America. The wars continued until the end of the French and Indian War in 1763, when France lost New France.

=== Province of Pennsylvania ===
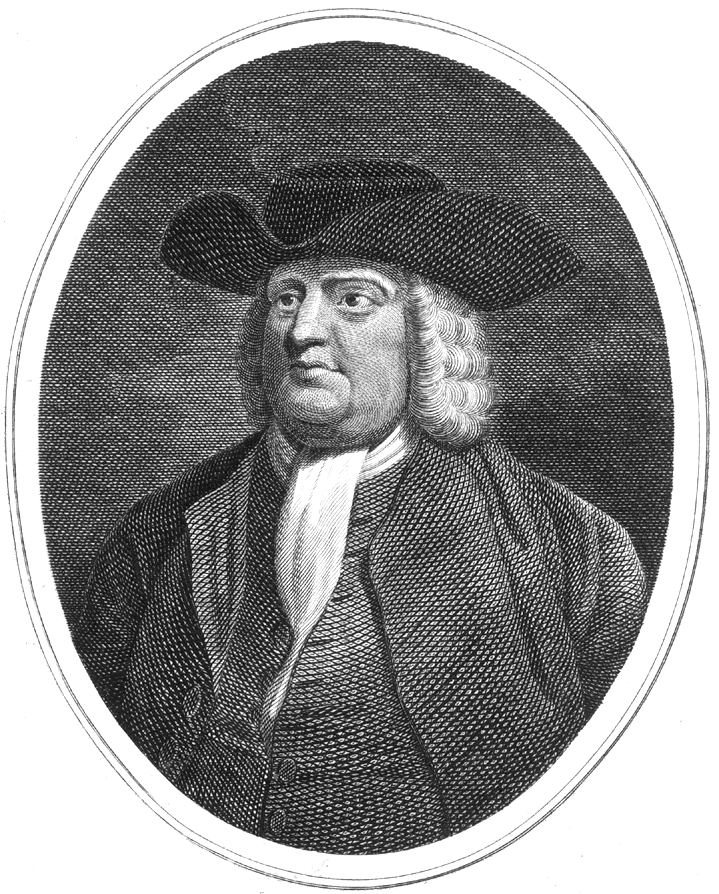
William Penn, founder of the Province of Pennsylvania, was a Quaker and the son of a prominent admiral of the same name.

The colonial possessions of Britain (in pink), France (in blue), and Spain (in orange) as of 1750. The French later lost their possessions in North America to Britain following its defeat in the French and Indian War, fought from 1754 to 1763

On March 4, 1681, Charles II of England granted the Province of Pennsylvania to William Penn to settle a debt of £16,000 (around £2,100,000 in 2008, adjusting for retail inflation) that the king owed to Penn's father. Pennsylvania was one of the two major Restoration colonies. Penn founded a proprietary colony that provided a place of religious freedom for Quakers. Charles named the colony Pennsylvania ("Penn's woods" in Latin), after the elder Penn, which the younger Penn found embarrassing, as he feared people would think he had named the colony after himself. Penn landed in North America in October 1682, and founded the colonial capital, Philadelphia, that same year.

In addition to English Quakers, Pennsylvania attracted several other ethnic and religious groups, many of whom were fleeing persecution and the religious wars. Welsh Quakers settled a large tract of land north and west of Philadelphia, in what are now Montgomery, Chester, and Delaware counties. This area became known as the "Welsh Tract", and many cities and towns were named for points in Wales. The colony's reputation of religious freedom and tolerance also attracted significant populations of German, Scots-Irish, Scots, and French settlers. Many of the settlers worshiped a brand of Christianity disfavored by the government of their homeland, including Huguenots, Puritans, Calvinists, Mennonites, and Catholics, who migrated to colonial-era Pennsylvania to exercise their religion freely. Other groups, including Anglicans and Jews, migrated to Pennsylvania, while Pennsylvania also had a significant African-American population by 1730. Additionally, several Native American tribes lived in the area under their own jurisdiction. Settlers of Swedish and Dutch colonies that had been taken over by the British continued to live in the region.

To give his new province access to the ocean, Penn had leased the proprietary rights of the King Charles II's brother, James, Duke of York, to the "three lower counties" (now the state of Delaware) on the Delaware River. In Penn's Frame of Government of 1682, Penn established a combined assembly by providing for equal membership from each county and requiring legislation to have the assent of both the Lower Counties and the Upper Counties. The meeting place for the assembly alternated between Philadelphia and New Castle. In 1704, after disagreements between the upper and lower counties, the lower counties began meeting in a separate assembly. Province of Pennsylvania and Delaware continued to share the same royal governor until the American Revolutionary War, when both Pennsylvania and Delaware became states.

Penn died in 1718, and was succeeded as proprietor of the colony by his sons. While Penn had won the respect of the Lenape for his honest dealing, Penn's sons and agents were less sensitive to Native American concerns. The 1737 Walking Purchase expanded the colony, but caused a decline in relations with the Lenape. Pennsylvania continued to expand and settle in the areas to the West until the Royal Proclamation of 1763, which forbade all settlers from settling on the western side of the Appalachian Mountains. Meanwhile, Philadelphia became an important port and trading center. The University of Pennsylvania was founded during this period, and Benjamin Franklin established various other organizations such as the American Philosophical Society, the Union Fire Company, and the Pennsylvania Abolition Society. By the start of the American Revolution, Philadelphia was the largest city in British North America.

The western portions of Pennsylvania were among disputed territory between the colonial British and French during the French and Indian War (the North American component of the Seven Years' War). The French had established numerous fortified sites in Pennsylvania, including Fort Le Boeuf, Fort Presque Isle, Fort Machault, and the pivotal Fort Duquesne, located near the present site of Pittsburgh. Many Indian tribes were allied with the French because of their long trading history and opposition to the expansion of the British colonies. The conflict began near the present site of Uniontown, Pennsylvania when a company of Virginia militia under the command of George Washington ambushed a French force at the Battle of Jumonville Glen in 1754. Washington retreated to Fort Necessity and surrendered to a larger French force at the Battle of Fort Necessity. In 1755, the British sent the Braddock Expedition to capture Fort Duquesne, but the expedition ended in failure after the British lost the Battle of the Monongahela near present-day Braddock, Pennsylvania. In 1758, the British sent the Forbes Expedition to capture Fort Duquesne. The French won the Battle of Fort Duquesne, but after the battle the outnumbered French force demolished Fort Duquesne and retreated from the area. Fighting in North America had mostly come to an end by 1760, but the war continued until the signing of the Treaty of Paris in 1763. Britain's victory in the war helped secure Pennsylvania's frontier, as the Ohio Country came under formal British control. Although New France was no more, the French would deal their British rivals a major blow in the American Revolution by aiding the rebel cause.

During the French and Indian War, Pennsylvania settlers experienced raids from Indian allies of the French. The settlers' pleas for military relief were stymied by a power struggle in Philadelphia between Governor Robert Morris and the Pennsylvania Assembly. Morris wanted to send military forces to the frontier, but the Assembly, whose leadership included Benjamin Franklin, refused to grant the funds unless Morris agreed to the taxation of the proprietary lands, the vast tracts still owned by the Penn family and others. The dispute was finally settled, and military relief sent, when the owners of the proprietary lands sent 5,000 pounds to the colonial government, on condition that it was considered a free gift and not a down payment on taxes.

Shortly after the end of the French and Indian War, Indians attempted to drive the British out of Ohio country in Pontiac's Rebellion. The war, which began in 1763, saw heavy fighting in western Pennsylvania. The native forces were defeated in the Battle of Bushy Run. The war lasted until 1766, when the British made peace. During the war, the king issued the Proclamation Act. The act barred Americans from any settling west of the Appalachians, and reserved that territory for the Native Americans. Fighting between Native Americans and Americans in present-day Pennsylvania continued in Lord Dunmore's War and the Revolutionary War. Native American tribes ceased to pose a military threat to European settlers in Pennsylvania after the conclusion of the Northwest Indian War in 1795.

By the mid-18th century Pennsylvania was basically a middle-class colony with limited deference to the small upper-class. A writer in the Pennsylvania Journal in 1756 summed it up:

The People of this Province are generally of the middling Sort, and at present pretty much upon a Level. They are chiefly industrious Farmers, Artificers or Men in Trade; they enjoy and are fond of Freedom, and the meanest among them thinks he has a right to Civility from the greatest.

== American Revolution ==
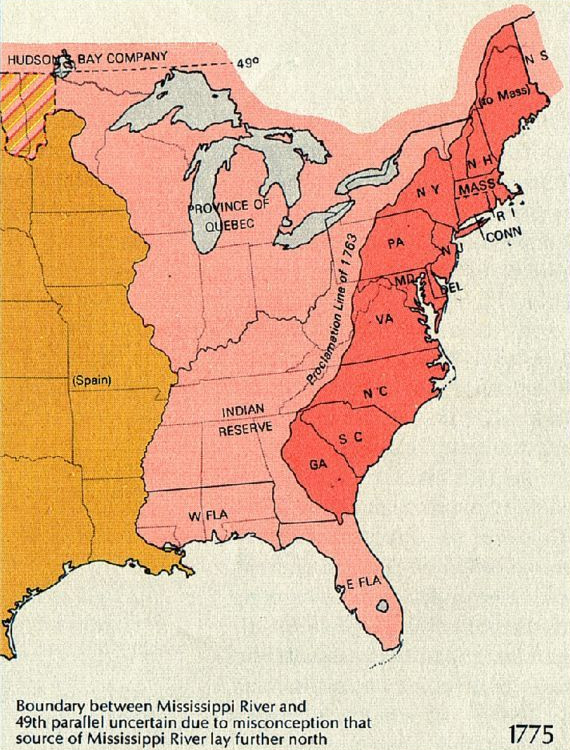
A 1763 map of the Thirteen Colonies and the Indian Reserve, a settlement prohibited by the British Crown that sparked resentment among Americans

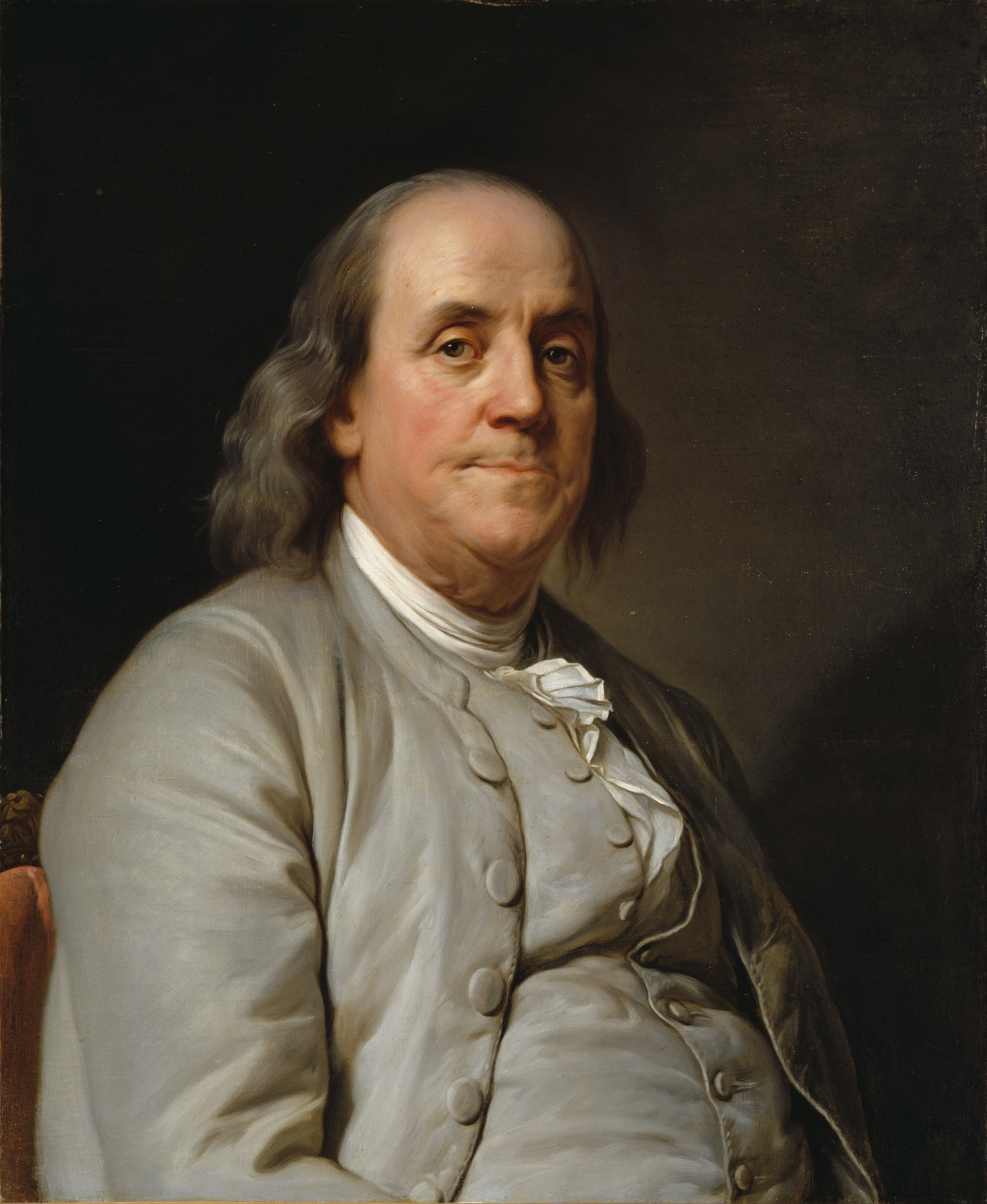
Benjamin Franklin, a Founding Father of the United States and Pennsylvania delegate to the Second Continental Congress, which created the Continental Army in 1775 and unanimously adopted and issued the Declaration of Independence on July 4, 1776

Pennsylvania's residents generally supported the protests common to all Thirteen Colonies after the Proclamation of 1763 and the Stamp Act were passed, and Pennsylvania sent delegates to the Stamp Act Congress in 1765 Philadelphia hosted the first and second Continental Congress.

Gathered in the present-day Independence Hall in Philadelphia, the Second Continental Congress founded the Continental Army, appointed George Washington as its commander, and, on July 4, 1776, unanimously adopted the Declaration of Independence, which both formalized and escalated the American Revolutionary War.

Pennsylvania was the site of several battles and military activities during the Revolutionary War, including George Washington's crossing of the Delaware River, the Battle of Brandywine, and the Battle of Germantown. During the Philadelphia campaign, the rebel army of George Washington spent the winter of 1777–78 at Valley Forge, Pennsylvania. In 1781, the Articles of Confederation were written and adopted in York, Pennsylvania, and Philadelphia continued to serve as the capital of the fledgling nation until the Pennsylvania Mutiny of 1783. Notable Pennsylvanians who supported the Revolution include John Dickinson, Robert Morris, Anthony Wayne, Samuel Van Leer, James Wilson, and Thomas Mifflin. However, Pennsylvania was also home to numerous Loyalists, including Joseph Galloway, William Allen, and the Doan Outlaws.

After elections in May 1776 returned old guard Assemblymen to office, the Second Continental Congress encouraged Pennsylvania to call delegates together to discuss a new form of governance. Delegates met in June in Philadelphia, where the signing of the Declaration of Independence soon overtook assemblymen's efforts to control the delegates and the outcome of their discussions. On July 8, 1776, attendees elected delegates to write a state constitution. A committee was formed with Benjamin Franklin as chair and George Bryan and James Cannon as prominent members. The new constitution on September 28, 1776, called for new elections.

Elections in 1776 turned the old assemblymen out of power. But the new constitution lacked a governor or upper legislative house to provide checks against popular movements. It also required test oaths, which kept the opposition from taking office. The constitution called for a unicameral legislature or Assembly. Executive authority rested in a Supreme Executive Council whose members were to be appointed by the assembly. During elections in 1776, radicals gained control of the Assembly. By early 1777, they had selected an executive council, and Thomas Wharton Jr. was named as the president of the council. This constitution was never formally adopted, so government functioned on an ad hoc basis until the new constitution was written fourteen years later.

=== Fall of Philadelphia ===
After the Continental Army's defeat at the Battle of Brandywine in Chadds Ford Township on September 11, 1777, the revolutionary capital of Philadelphia was left defenseless and American patriots began preparing for an imminent British attack on the city. Pennsylvania's Supreme Executive Council ordered that 11 bells, including the State House Bell, now known as the Liberty Bell, and bells from Philadelphia's Christ Church and St. Peter's Church, be taken down and moved out of Philadelphia to prevent the British from melting the bells down to cast into munitions. The bells were transported north to present-day Allentown by two farmers and wagon masters, John Snyder and Henry Bartholomew, and hidden under floorboards in the basement of Zion Reformed Church in what is now Center City Allentown, just prior to the British capture of Philadelphia in September 1777.

=== State and federal constitutions ===
In 1780, Pennsylvania passed a law that provided for the gradual abolition of slavery, making Pennsylvania the first state to pass an act to abolish slavery, although Vermont (not yet a state) had also previously abolished slavery. Children born after that date to slave mothers were considered legally free, but they were bound in indentured servitude to the master of their mother until the age of 28.

Six years after the adoption of the Articles of Confederation, delegates from across the country met again at the Philadelphia Convention to establish a new constitution. Pennsylvania ratified the U.S. Constitution on December 12, 1787, the second state to do so after Delaware. The Constitution took effect after eleven states ratified the document in 1788, and George Washington was inaugurated as the first President of the United States on March 4, 1789.

After the passage of the Residence Act, Philadelphia again served as the capital of the nation from 1790 to 1800 prior to the development of Washington, D.C. as the nation's new capital.

Pennsylvania ratified a new state constitution in 1790, which replaced the state's executive council with a governor and a bicameral legislature.

== Westward expansion ==
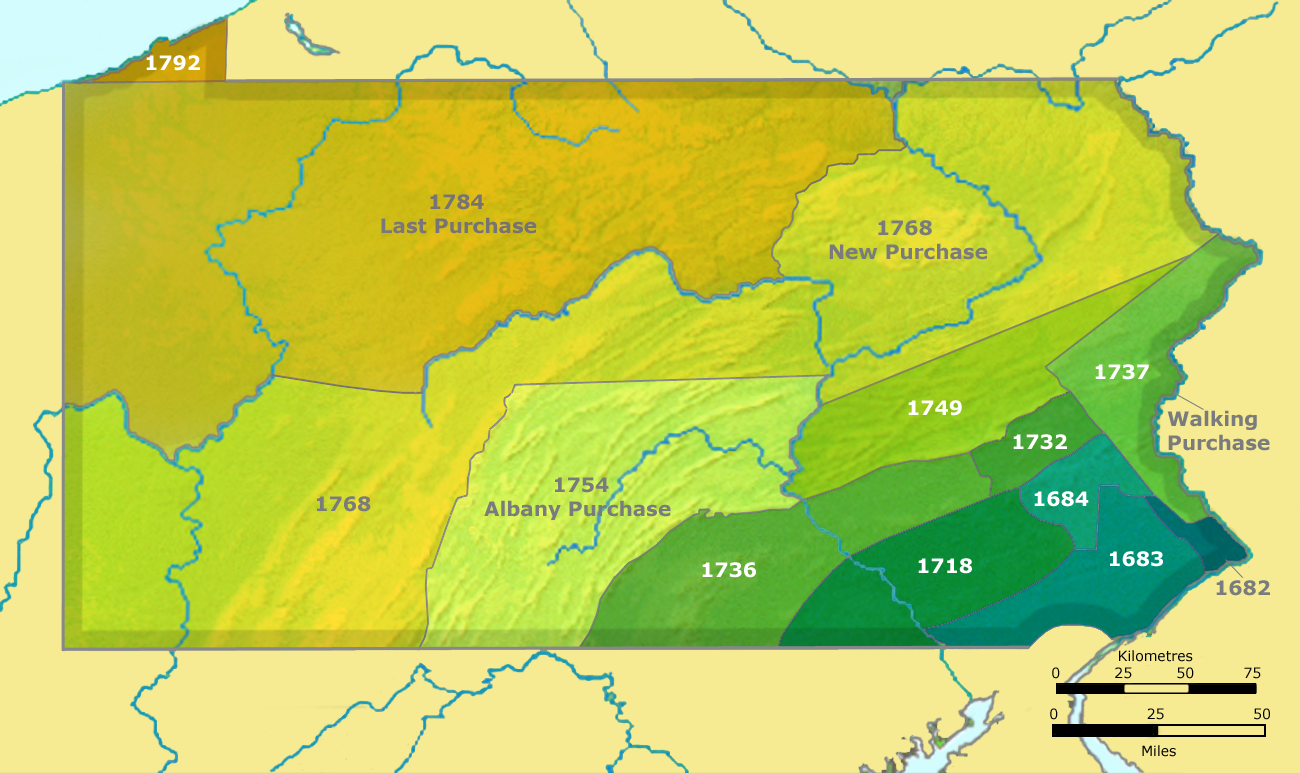
Land purchases from Native Americans in the 17th and 18th centuries

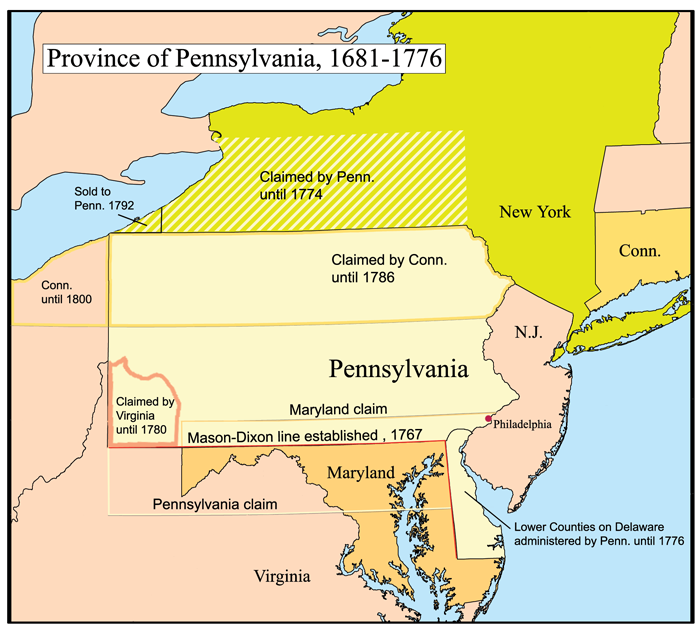
A map of the colonial Province of Pennsylvania and competing land claims against it from other states

Pennsylvania's borders took definitive shape in the decades before and after the Revolutionary War. The Mason–Dixon line established the borders between Pennsylvania and Maryland, and was later extended to serve as the border between Pennsylvania and Virginia, except for what is present-day West Virginia's northern panhandle. Although some settlers proposed the creation of the state of Westsylvania in the area that now contains Pittsburgh, Pennsylvania retained control of the region. The first Treaty of Fort Stanwix and the Treaty of Fort McIntosh saw Native Americans relinquish claims on present-day southwestern Pennsylvania. The Treaty of Paris (1783) granted the United States independence, and also saw Great Britain give up its land claims in the neighboring Ohio Country, although most of these lands ultimately became new states under the terms of the Northwest Ordinance of 1787. In the second Treaty of Fort Stanwix, Pennsylvania gained control of northwestern Pennsylvania from the Iroquois League. The New York–Pennsylvania border was established in 1787. Pennsylvania purchased the Erie Triangle from the federal government in 1792. In 1799, the Pennamite–Yankee War came to an end, as Pennsylvania kept control of the Wyoming Valley despite the presence of settlers from Connecticut.

After the U.S. government granted land to Revolutionary War soldiers for military service, the Pennsylvania General Assembly passed a general land act on April 3, 1792. It authorized the sale and distribution of the large remaining tracts of land east and west of the Allegheny River in hopes of sparking development of the vast territory. The process was an uneven affair, prompting much speculation but little settlement. Most veteran soldiers sold their shares sight unseen under market value, and many investors were ultimately ruined. The East Allegheny district consisted of lands in Potter, McKean, Cameron, Elk, and Jefferson counties, at the time worthless tracts. West Allegheny district was made up of lands in Erie, Crawford, Warren, and Venango counties, relatively good investments at the time.

Three major land companies participated in the land speculation that followed. Holland Land Company and its agent, Theophilus Cazenove acquired 1,000,000 acres (4,000 km^{2}) of East Allegheny district land and 500,000 acres (2,000 km^{2}) of West Allegheny land from Pennsylvania Supreme Court justice James Wilson. The Pennsylvania Population Company and its president, Pennsylvania State Comptroller General John Nicholson, controlled 500,000 acres (2,000 km^{2}) of land, mostly in Erie County and the Beaver Valley. The North American Land Company and its patron, Robert Morris, held some Pennsylvania lands but was vested mostly in upstate New York, former Iroquois territory.

=== Whiskey Rebellion ===
The Whiskey Rebellion, centered in Western Pennsylvania, was one of the first major challenges to the new federal government under the United States Constitution. From 1791 to 1794, farmers rebelled against an excise tax on distilled spirits, and prevented federal officials from collecting the tax. In 1794, President George Washington led a 15,000-soldier militia force into Western Pennsylvania to put down the rebellion, and most rebels returned home before the huge militia force arrived.

== 19th century ==
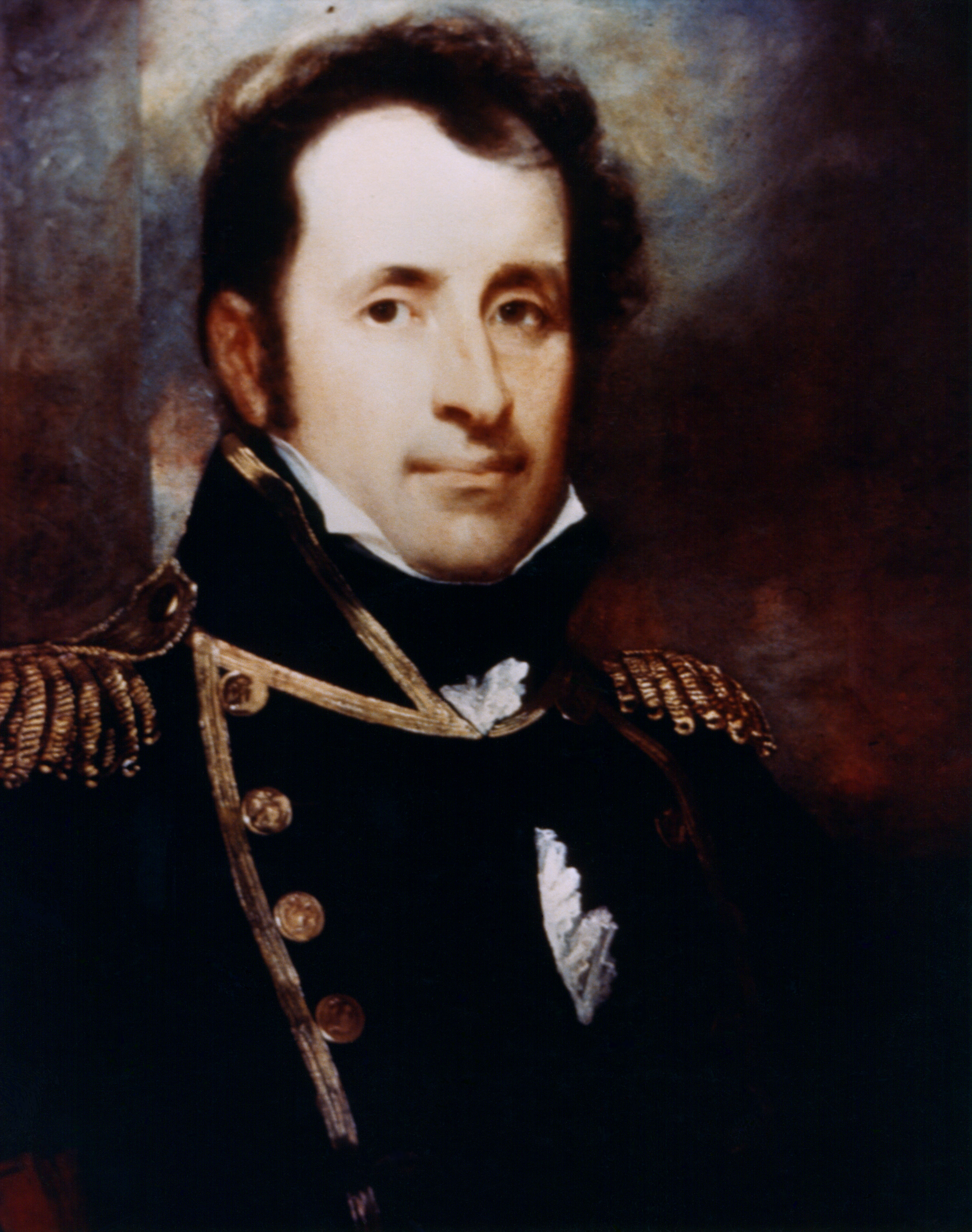
Stephen Decatur, a 19th-century naval commander who served in the War of 1812 and other engagements

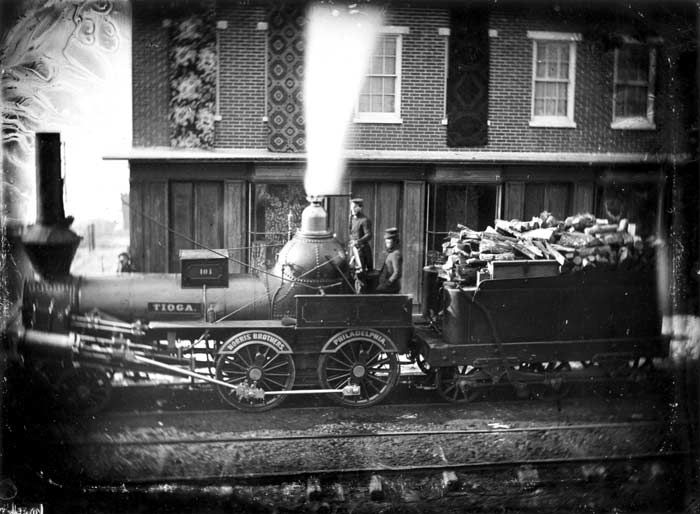
The locomotive Tioga in Philadelphia in 1848; Pennsylvania was an important railroad center throughout the 19th century.

Pennsylvania, one of the largest states in the country, always had the second most electoral votes from 1796 to 1960. From 1789 to 1880, the state only voted for two losing presidential candidates: Thomas Jefferson (in 1796) and Andrew Jackson (in the unusual 1824 election). The Democratic-Republicans dominated the state for most of the First Party System, as the Federalists experienced little success in the state after the 1800 election. Pennsylvania generally supported Andrew Jackson and the Democratic Party in the Second Party System (1828–54), although the Whigs won several elections in the 1840s and 1850s. The Anti-Masonic Party was perhaps Pennsylvania's most successful third party, as it elected Pennsylvania's only third-party governor (Joseph Ritner) and several congressmen in the 1830s.

=== War of 1812 ===
Several Pennsylvanians fought in the War of 1812, including Jacob Brown, John Barry, and Stephen Decatur. Decatur, who served in both Barbary Wars and the Quasi-War, was one of America's first post-Revolution war heroes. Commodore Oliver Hazard Perry earned the title "Hero of Lake Erie" after building a squadron at Erie, Pennsylvania and defeating a smaller British squadron at the Battle of Lake Erie. Pennsylvanians such as David Conner fought in the Mexican–American War, and Pennsylvania raised two regiments for the war. Pennsylvania Congressman David Wilmot earned national prominence for the Wilmot Proviso, which would have banned slavery in territory acquired from Mexico.

Philadelphia continued to be one of the most populous cities in the country, and it was the second-largest city after New York City for most of the 19th century. In 1854, the Act of Consolidation consolidated the city and county of Philadelphia. The Academy of Natural Sciences of Philadelphia and the Franklin Institute were founded during this period. Philadelphia served as the home of the Bank of North America and its successors, the First and Second Bank of the United States, all three of which served as the central bank of the United States. Philadelphia was also home to the first stock exchange, museum, insurance company, and medical school in the new nation.

=== Western Pennsylvania development ===
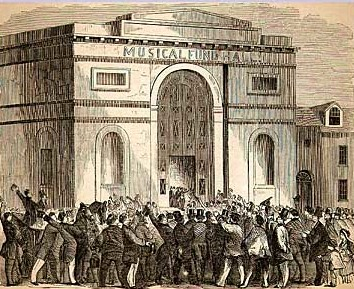
A woodcut illustration of the crowd at the first Republican National Convention in 1856 at Musical Fund Hall at 808 Locust Street in Philadelphia

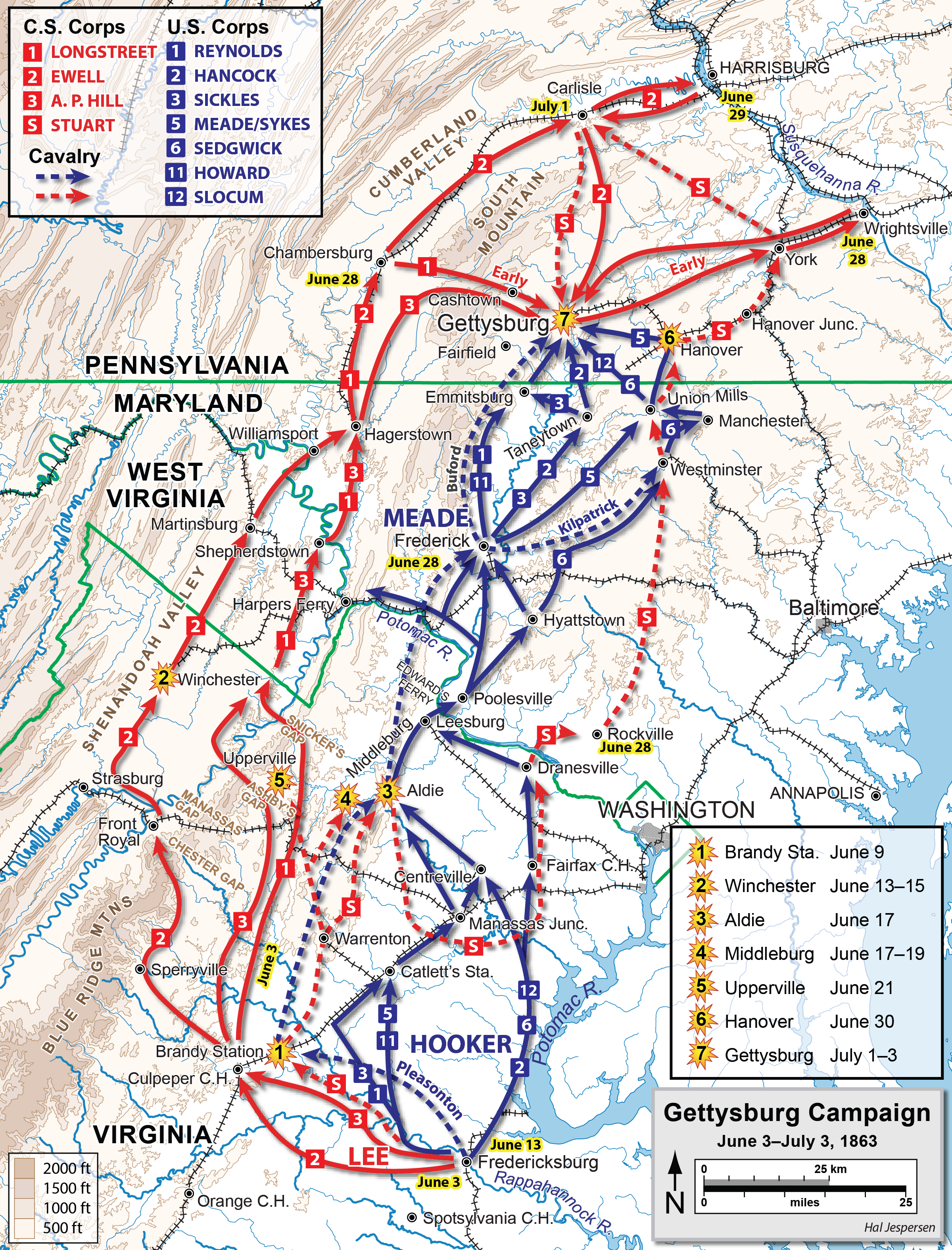
The Gettysburg campaign, which culminated in the Battle of Gettysburg, was a major turning point in the American Civil War and the war's bloodiest battle with an estimated 46,000 to 51,000 casualties

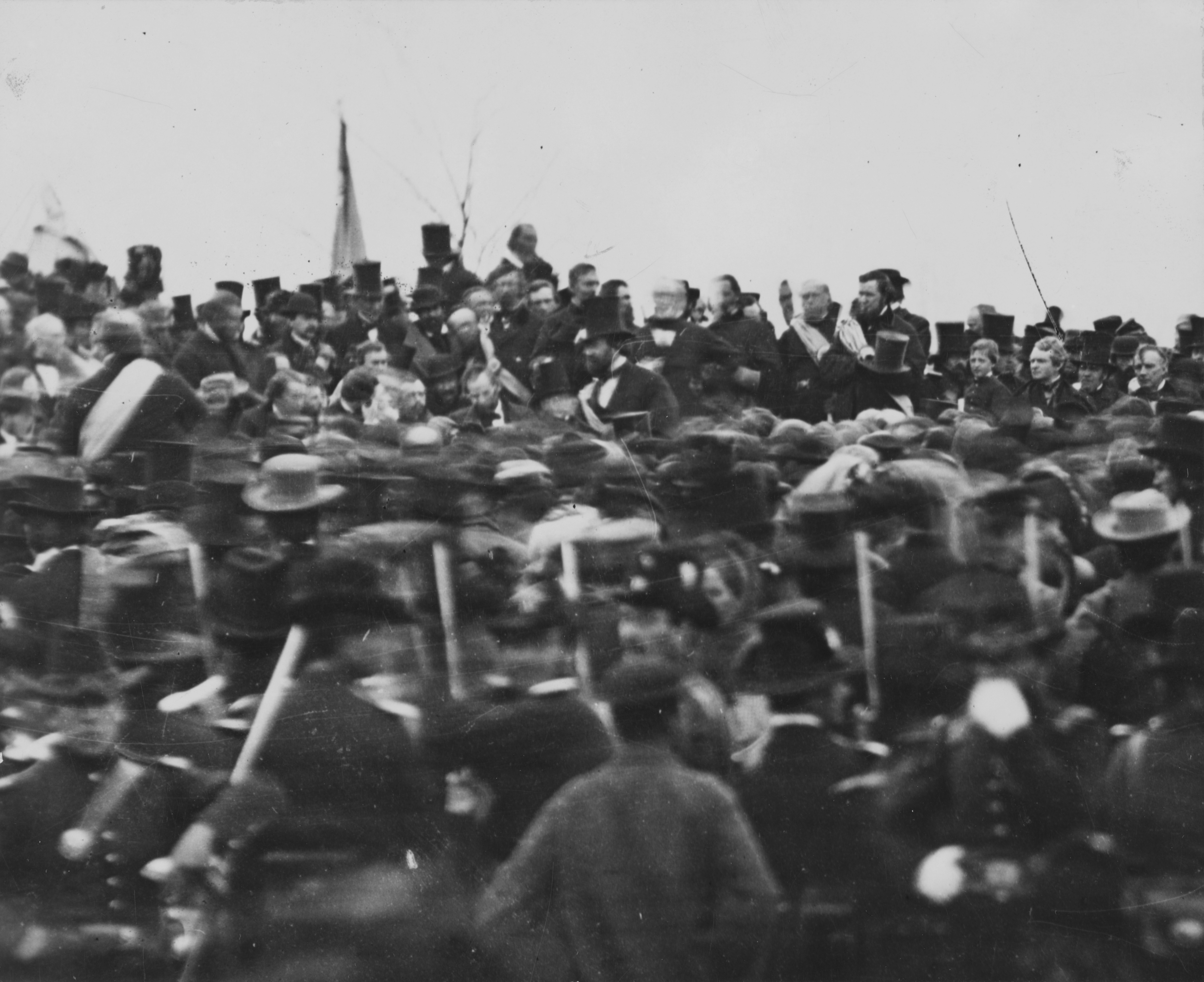
One of only two confirmed photos of Abraham Lincoln (sitting in center, facing camera, without his traditional top hat) at Gettysburg a few hours prior to giving the Gettysburg Address at Gettysburg National Cemetery on November 19, 1863. The address, which was only 271 words in length, ranks among the most famed speeches in American history.

Settlers continued to cross the Allegheny Mountains. Pennsylvanians built many new roads, and the National Road cut through Southwestern Pennsylvania. Pennsylvania also saw the construction of thousands of miles of rail, and the Pennsylvania Railroad became one of the largest railroads in the world. Pittsburgh grew into an important town West of the Alleghenies, although the Great Fire of Pittsburgh devastated the town in the 1840s. In 1834, Pennsylvania completed construction on the Main Line of Public Works, a railroad and canal system that stretched across southern Pennsylvania, connecting Philadelphia and Pittsburgh. In 1812, Harrisburg was named the capital of the state, providing a more central location than Philadelphia.

Pennsylvania had established itself as the largest food producer in the country by the 1720s, and Pennsylvania agriculture experienced a "golden age" from 1790 to 1840. In 1820, agriculture provided 90 percent of the employment in Pennsylvania. Farm equipment manufacturers sprang up across the state as inventors across the world pioneered new equipment and techniques, and Pennsylvanians such as Frederick Watts were a part of this scientific approach to farming. Pennsylvania farmers lost some of their political power as other industries emerged in the state, but even in the 2000s agriculture remains one of Pennsylvania's major industries.

In 1834, Governor George Wolf signed the Free Schools Act, which created a system of state-regulated school districts. The state created the Department of Education to oversee these schools. In 1857, the Normal School Act laid the foundation for the creation of normal schools to train teachers.

Several Pennsylvania politicians gained national renown. Frederick Muhlenberg of Pennsylvania served as the nation's first Speaker of the House of Representatives. Albert Gallatin served as the Secretary of the Treasury from 1801 to 1814. Democrat James Buchanan, the first President of the United States from Pennsylvania, took office in 1857 and served until 1861.

Prior to and during the American Civil War, Pennsylvania was a divided state. Although Pennsylvania had outlawed slavery, there were still Pennsylvanians who believed that the federal government should not interfere with the institution of slavery. One such individual was Democrat James Buchanan, the last pre-Civil War president. Buchanan's party had generally won presidential and gubernatorial elections in Pennsylvania.

=== 1856 and 1860 presidential elections ===
The nascent Republican Party's first convention took place at Musical Fund Hall on Locust Street in Philadelphia. In the 1860 elections, the Republican Party won the state's presidential vote and the governor's office.

== Civil War ==
In the presidential campaign of 1860, Pennsylvania's electoral votes went to Republican Abraham Lincoln, whose election led to the secession of the Southern states and the outbreak of the American Civil War. Despite the Republican victory, Democrats remained powerful in the state during the war, and several Copperheads in the party called for an immediate peace settlement, with slavery to be sustained where it existed. The Democrats regained control of the state legislature in the 1862 election, but incumbent Republican Governor Andrew Curtin retained the office in 1863. In the 1864 election, President Lincoln narrowly defeated Pennsylvania native George B. McClellan for the state's electoral votes.

The state contributed significantly to the Union effort during the Civil War. An estimated 360,000 Pennsylvanians served throughout the four-year conflict. Many of these men, as well as other Union recruits, about 300,000 in total, were trained at Camp Curtin in Harrisburg. Among the Pennsylvanians, 8,600 African Americans, organized into all-Black troops with white officers, fought in the war; many had been trained at Camp William Penn near Philadelphia. In addition to McClellan, Union officers from Pennsylvania included George Gordon Meade, Winfield Scott Hancock, John F. Reynolds, David McMurtrie Gregg, Samuel W. Crawford, John W. Geary, and John F. Hartranft, as well as the Navy's David Dixon Porter.

Pennsylvania was the target of several raids by the Confederate States Army. J.E.B. Stuart made cavalry raids in 1862 and 1863; John Imboden raided in 1863 and John McCausland in 1864, when his troopers burned the city of Chambersburg. However, easily the most famous and important military engagement in Pennsylvania was the Battle of Gettysburg, which is considered by many historians to be the major turning point of the Civil War. The battle, called "the high water mark of the Confederacy", was a major union victory in the Eastern theater of the war, and the Confederacy was generally on the defensive following the battle. Dead from this battle rest at Gettysburg National Cemetery, established at the site of Abraham Lincoln's Gettysburg Address. A number of smaller engagements were also fought in the state during the Gettysburg campaign, including the battles of Hanover, Carlisle, Hunterstown, and the Fairfield.

Pennsylvania's Thaddeus Stevens and William D. Kelley emerged as leading members of the Radical Republicans, a group of Republicans that advocated winning the war, abolishing slavery, and protecting the civil rights of African-Americans during Reconstruction. Governor Andrew Curtin strongly supported the war and urged his fellow governors to do the same, while former Pennsylvania Senator Simon Cameron served as Secretary of War before his removal.

=== Post-Civil War ===
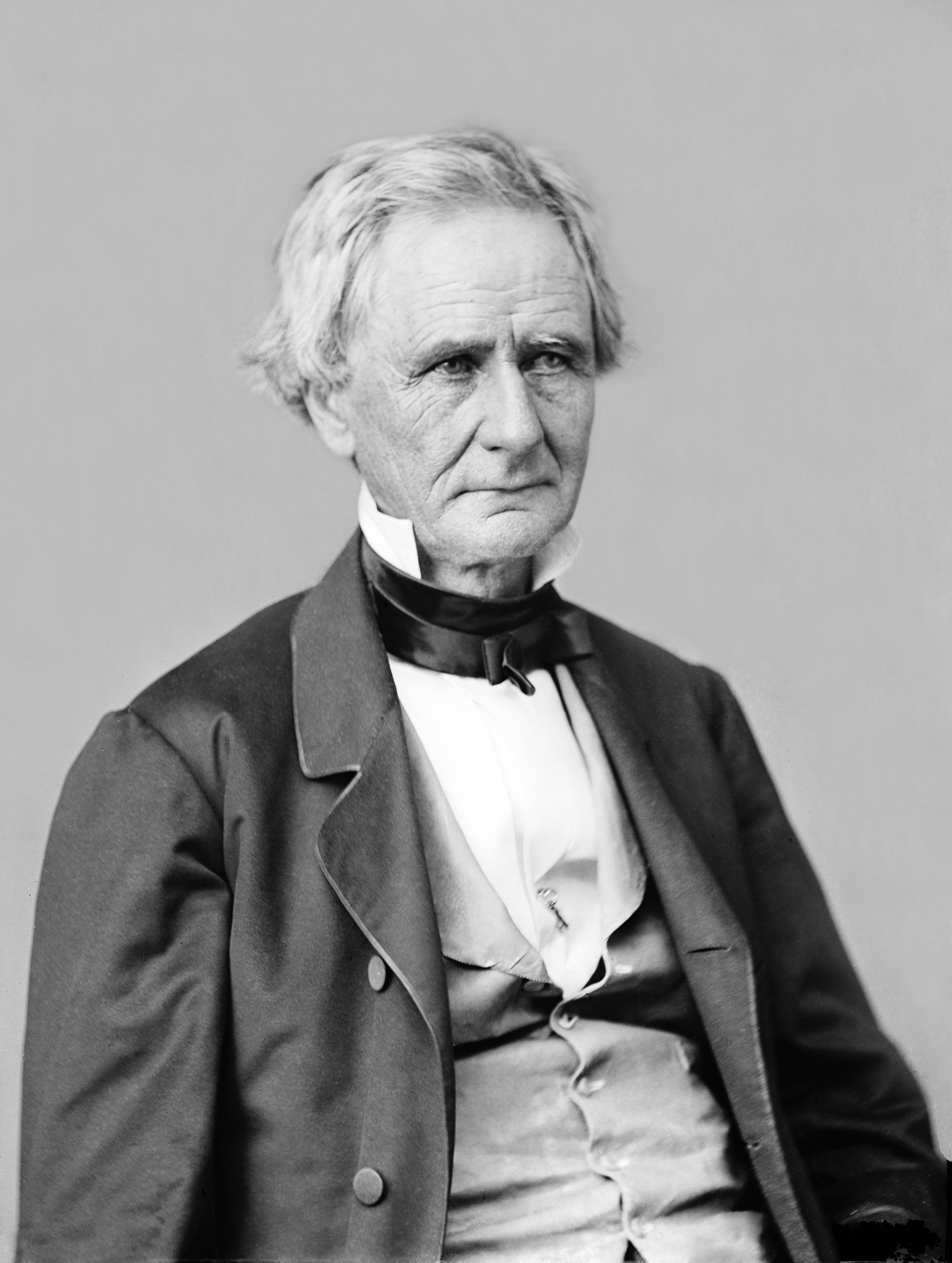
Simon Cameron of Maytown was Secretary of War and head of Pennsylvania's Republican Party, whose party machine controlled Pennsylvania into the 20th century.

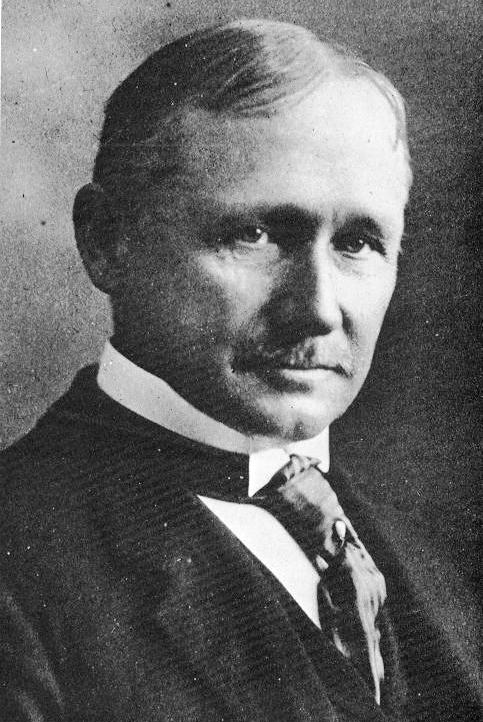
Frederick Winslow Taylor of Philadelphia, a late 19th and early 20th century pioneer in scientific management

Following the Civil War, the Republican Party exercised strong control over politics in the state, as Republicans won almost every election during the Third Party System (1854–1894) and the Party System (1896–1930). Pennsylvania remained one of the most populous states in the Union, and the state's large number of electoral votes helped Republicans dominate presidential elections from 1860 to 1928. Only once during that period did Pennsylvania vote for a presidential candidate that was not a Republican; the lone exception was former Republican President Theodore Roosevelt in 1912. The Republican Party was nearly as dominant in gubernatorial elections, as Robert E. Pattison was the lone non-Republican to win election as governor between 1860 and 1930. In the 1870s, Pennsylvanians embraced the constitutional reform movement that was sweeping across several states, and Pennsylvania passed a new constitution in 1874. The state created the office of lieutenant governor and made the offices of state auditor and state treasurer into elective offices. The term of the Governor of Pennsylvania was extended to four years, but the governor was prohibited from serving two consecutive terms.

The Pennsylvania Republican party was led by a series of powerful officials, including founder Simon Cameron, his son J. Donald Cameron, Matthew Quay, and Boies Penrose. Quay in particular was one of the dominant political figures of his era, as he served as chairman of the Republican National Committee and helped place Theodore Roosevelt on the 1900 Republican ticket. Following Penrose's death in the 1920s, no one boss dominated the state party, but Pennsylvania Republicans continued to be significantly more powerful than the Democrats until the 1950s. Although the party bosses dominated politics, the Republicans also had a reform movement that challenged their power. Many Pennsylvanians supported the Progressive movement, including Philander C. Knox, Gifford Pinchot, and John Tener. Several new state agencies were established during this time, including the Department of Welfare and the Department of Labor and Industry. Pennsylvanians twice rejected an amendment to the state constitution that would have granted women the right to vote, but the state was one of the first to ratify the Nineteenth Amendment, which granted women the right to vote nationwide.

The era after the Civil War, known as the Gilded Age, saw the continued rise of industry in Pennsylvania. Pennsylvania was home to some of the largest steel companies in the world. Andrew Carnegie founded the Carnegie Steel Company and Charles M. Schwab founded Bethlehem Steel. Other industry titans, including John D. Rockefeller and Jay Gould, operated in the state. In the latter half of the 19th century, the U.S. oil industry was born in western Pennsylvania, which supplied the vast majority of kerosene for years thereafter. As the Pennsylvanian oil rush developed, the oil boom towns, such as Titusville, rose and fell. Coal mining was also a major industry in the state.

== 20th century ==
In 1903, Milton S. Hershey began construction on a chocolate factory in Hershey, Pennsylvania; The Hershey Company would become the largest chocolate manufacturer in North America. The Heinz Company was also founded during this period. These huge companies exercised a large influence on the politics of Pennsylvania; as Henry Demarest Lloyd put it, oil baron John D. Rockefeller "had done everything with the Pennsylvania legislature except refine it". Pennsylvania created a Department of Highways and engaged in a vast program of road-building, while railroads continued to see heavy usage.

The growth of industry eventually provided middle-class incomes to working-class households, after the development of labor unions helped them gain living wages. However, the rise of unions led to a rise of union busting, with several private police forces springing up. Pennsylvania was the location of the first documented organized strike in North America, and Pennsylvania experienced the Great Railroad Strike of 1877 and the Coal Strike of 1902. Eventually, the eight-hour day was adopted, and the "coal and iron police" were banned. Similarly In 1922, 310,000 Pennsylvania miners went on strike during the UMW General coal strike.

During this period, the United States was the destination of millions of immigrants. Previous immigration had mostly come from western and northern Europe, but during this period Pennsylvania experienced heavy immigration from southern and eastern Europe. As many new immigrants were Catholic and Jewish, they changed the demographics of major cities and industrial areas. Pennsylvania and New York received many of the new immigrants, who entered through New York and Philadelphia and worked in the developing industries. Many of these poor immigrants took jobs in factories, steel mills, and coal mines throughout the state, where they were not restricted because of their lack of English. The availability of jobs and public education systems helped integrate the millions of immigrants and their families, who also retained ethnic cultures. Pennsylvania also experienced the Great Migration, in which millions of African Americans migrated from the southern United States to other locations in the United States. By 1940, African Americans made up almost five percent of the state's population.

Even prior to the Civil War in the mid-19th century, Pennsylvania had emerged as a center of scientific discovery, and the state, led by its two major urban centers, continued to be a major place of innovation. The state continued to innovate, as Pennsylvanians invented the first iron and steel t-rails, iron bridges, air brakes, switching signals, and drawn metal wires. Pennsylvanians also contributed to advances in aluminum production, radio, television, airplanes, and farm machinery. During this period, Pittsburgh emerged as an important center of industry and technological innovation, and George Westinghouse became one of the preeminent inventors of the United States. Philadelphia became one of the leading medical science centers in the nation, although it no longer rivaled New York City as a financial capital. Frederick Winslow Taylor pioneered the field of scientific management, becoming America's first "efficiency engineer". In 1890, Chicago had passed Philadelphia as the second most populous city in the United States, while Pittsburgh rose to the eighth spot after annexing Allegheny.

Education continued to be a major issue in the state, and the state constitution of 1874 guaranteed an annual appropriation for education. School attendance became compulsory in 1895, and by 1903, school districts were required to either have their own high schools or pay for their residents to attend another high school. Two of Pennsylvania's largest public schools were founded in the mid-to-late 19th century. The Pennsylvania State University was founded in 1855, and in 1863 the school became Pennsylvania's land-grant university under the terms of the Morrill Land-Grant Acts. Temple University in Philadelphia was founded in 1884 by Russell Conwell, originally as a night school for working-class citizens.

Other colleges and universities, including Bucknell University, Carnegie Mellon University, Drexel University, Duquesne University, La Salle University, Lafayette College, Lehigh University, Saint Francis University, Saint Joseph's University, and Villanova University, were founded in the 19th and early 20th centuries. Western University of Pennsylvania had been operating since 1787; in 1908, it changed its name to the University of Pittsburgh. The Carlisle Indian Industrial School was founded in 1879 as the flagship American Indian boarding school. Thousands of Pennsylvanians volunteered during the Spanish–American War, and many Pennsylvanians fought in the successful campaign against the Spanish in the Philippine Islands. Pennsylvania was an important industrial center in World War I, and the state provided over 300,000 soldiers for the army. Pennsylvanians Tasker H. Bliss, Peyton C. March, and William S. Sims all held important commands during the war. Following the war, the state suffered the effects of the Spanish flu.

=== Great Depression and World War II ===
Like much of the rest of the country, Democrats were much more successful in Pennsylvania during the Fifth Party System than they were in the previous two party systems. The Great Depression finally broke the lock on Republican power in the state, as Democrat Franklin Roosevelt won Pennsylvania's electoral votes in all three of his re-election campaigns. Roosevelt was the first Democrat to win the state's electoral votes since James Buchanan in 1856. In 1934, Pennsylvania elected Joseph F. Guffey to the Senate and George Earle III as governor; both individuals were the first Democrats elected to either office in the 20th century. Earle, with the help of a Democratic legislature, passed the "Little New Deal" in Pennsylvania, which included several reforms based on the New Deal and relaxed Pennsylvania's strict Blue laws. However, Republicans regained power in the state in the 1938 elections, and Democrats would not win another gubernatorial election until George M. Leader's successful candidacy in 1954.

Earle signed the Pennsylvania State Authority Act in 1936, which would purchase land from the state and add improvements to that land using state loans and grants. The state expected to receive federal grants and loans to fund the project under the administration of President Franklin D. Roosevelt and his New Deal. The Pennsylvania Supreme Court, in Kelly v Earle, found the Act violated the state constitution. This prevented the state from receiving federal funds for Works Progress Administration projects and making it difficult to lower the extremely high unemployment rate. Pennsylvania, with its large industrial labor force, suffered heavily during the Great Depression.

Pennsylvania manufactured 6.6 percent of total United States military armaments produced during World War II, ranking sixth among the 48 states. The Philadelphia Naval Yard served as an important naval base, and Pennsylvania produced important military leaders such as George C. Marshall, Hap Arnold, Jacob Devers, and Carl Spaatz.

During World War II, over one million Pennsylvanians served in the United States Armed Forces, and more Medals of Honor were awarded to Pennsylvanians than to individuals from any other state.

=== Late 20th century ===
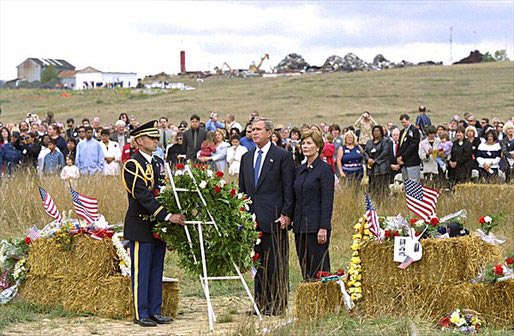
President George W. Bush and first lady Laura Bush honor victims of Flight 93 in Stonycreek Township on September 11, 2002, the first anniversary of the September 11 attacks

The Republican lock on Pennsylvania was broken in the era after World War II, and Pennsylvania became a somewhat less powerful state in terms of electoral votes and number of House seats. Pennsylvania adopted its fifth and current constitution in 1968; the new constitution established a unified judicial system and allows governors and the other statewide elected officials to serve two consecutive terms.

Between 1954 and 2012, each party consistently won two straight gubernatorial elections before ceding control to the other party. In presidential elections, the Republican Party won Pennsylvania in seven of the eleven elections between 1948 and 1988, but Democrats have won the state in every presidential election from 1992 to 2012. When Democratic presidential nominee Hubert Humphrey won Pennsylvania's electoral votes in 1968, he became the first non-Republican since 1824 to win Pennsylvania's votes without winning the presidential election. After having the second most electoral votes since the 18th century, Pennsylvania was eclipsed in electoral votes by California in 1964. Texas and Florida also now have more electoral votes, while New York also has more electoral votes and Illinois has the same number of electoral votes (and a slightly larger population).

As of 2014, Pennsylvania is generally considered to be an important swing state in both presidential and congressional elections, and Pennsylvania has a Cook PVI of D+1. Since the 1990s, Republicans have usually controlled both houses of the legislature, while candidates from both parties have been elected to the statewide offices of governor, lieutenant governor, attorney general, treasurer, and auditor general. Democrats generally win the cities and Republicans win the rural areas, with the suburbs voting for both parties and often acting as the key swing areas.

=== Steel industry declines ===
The state experience significant economic decline with the demise of the state's steel industry and other heavy industries, which began in the late 20th century and intensified in the 1980s. With job losses came heavy population losses, especially in Philadelphia and Pittsburgh. With the end of mining and the downturn of manufacturing, the state has turned to service industries. Pittsburgh's concentration of universities has enabled it to be a leader in technology and healthcare. Philadelphia has a concentration of university expertise. Healthcare, retail, transportation, and tourism are some of the state's growing industries of the postindustrial era. Like much of the rest of the nation, most residential population growth has occurred in suburban rather than urban areas, although both of the state's major cities have had significant revitalization of their downtown areas.

After 1990, as information-based industries became more important in the economy, state and local governments put more resources into the old, well-established public library system. Some localities, however, used new state funding to cut local taxes. New ethnic groups, especially Hispanics, began entering the state to fill low skill jobs in agriculture and service industries. For example, in Chester County, Mexican migrants brought their Spanish language and cuisine when they were hired as agricultural laborers. Meanwhile, Puerto Ricans built a large community in the state's third-largest city, Allentown, becoming forty percent of the city's population by 2000.

=== 21st century ===
On September 11, 2001, during the terrorist attacks on the United States, the small town of Shanksville, Pennsylvania received worldwide attention after United Airlines Flight 93 crashed into a field in Stonycreek Township, 1.75 miles (2.82 km) north of the town, killing all 40 civilians and four al-Qaeda hijackers on board. The hijackers had intended to fly the plane to Washington, D.C. and crash it into either the Capitol or the White House.

After learning from family members via airphone of the earlier attacks on the World Trade Center, the passengers on board revolted against the hijackers and fought for control of the plane, causing it to crash. It was the only one of the four aircraft hijacked that day that never reached its intended target and the heroism of the passengers has been commemorated.

== Urban centers ==
Philadelphia is the nation's sixth-largest city after New York City, Los Angeles, Chicago, Houston, and Phoenix. Philadelphia anchors the nation's sixth-largest metropolitan area. Pittsburgh is the center of Greater Pittsburgh, the nation's 22nd-largest metropolitan area. In eastern Pennsylvania, the Lehigh Valley has grown to the nation's 68th-largest metropolitan area as of 2020. Pennsylvania also has six other metropolitan areas that rank among the nation's 200-largest metropolitan areas. Philadelphia is the second-largest city in the Northeast megalopolis after New York City and is a core population center in the Northeastern United States. Pittsburgh, the state's second-largest city, is part of the Great Lakes Megalopolis and is often associated with the Midwestern United States. Both Allentown and Pittsburgh are considered part of the Rust Belt, a region of the United States negatively impacted by deindustrialization in the late 20th century.

== See also ==
- Education in Pennsylvania
- History of Erie, Pennsylvania
- History of Harrisburg, Pennsylvania
- History of logging in Pennsylvania
- History of the Mid-Atlantic States
- History of the Northeastern United States
- History of Philadelphia
- History of Pittsburgh
- History of slavery in Pennsylvania
- History of the Townships of Lycoming County, Pennsylvania
- History of West Chester, Pennsylvania
- History of Williamsport, Pennsylvania
- Jewish history in Pennsylvania
- List of historical Pennsylvania women
- List of historical societies in Pennsylvania
- List of newspapers in Pennsylvania in the 18th-century
- List of Pennsylvania suffragists
- Pennsylvania Historical and Museum Commission
- Pennsylvania Woman's Convention at West Chester in 1852
- Timeline of Philadelphia
- Timeline of Pittsburgh
- Women's suffrage in Pennsylvania
