= Scahentoarrhonon =

Indigenous people of Pennsylvania

The Scahentoarrhonon were an Iroquoian Indigenous people of Eastern North America that spoke an unattested Iroquoian language. They lived within the Susquehanna watershed between the nations of the Haudenosaunee Confederacy to the north, the Lenape to the east and the namesakes of the Susquehanna River, the Susquehannock, downriver to the south. The Scahentoarrhonon had contact with New Netherland and alliances with both the Neutral and Wendat Confederacies. They lived along the northern branch of the Susquehanna River on the Wyoming Flats above present day Wilkes-Barre, a country called Scahentowanen ('It is a very great plain') by other Iroquoian language speaking peoples.

== Name and identification ==
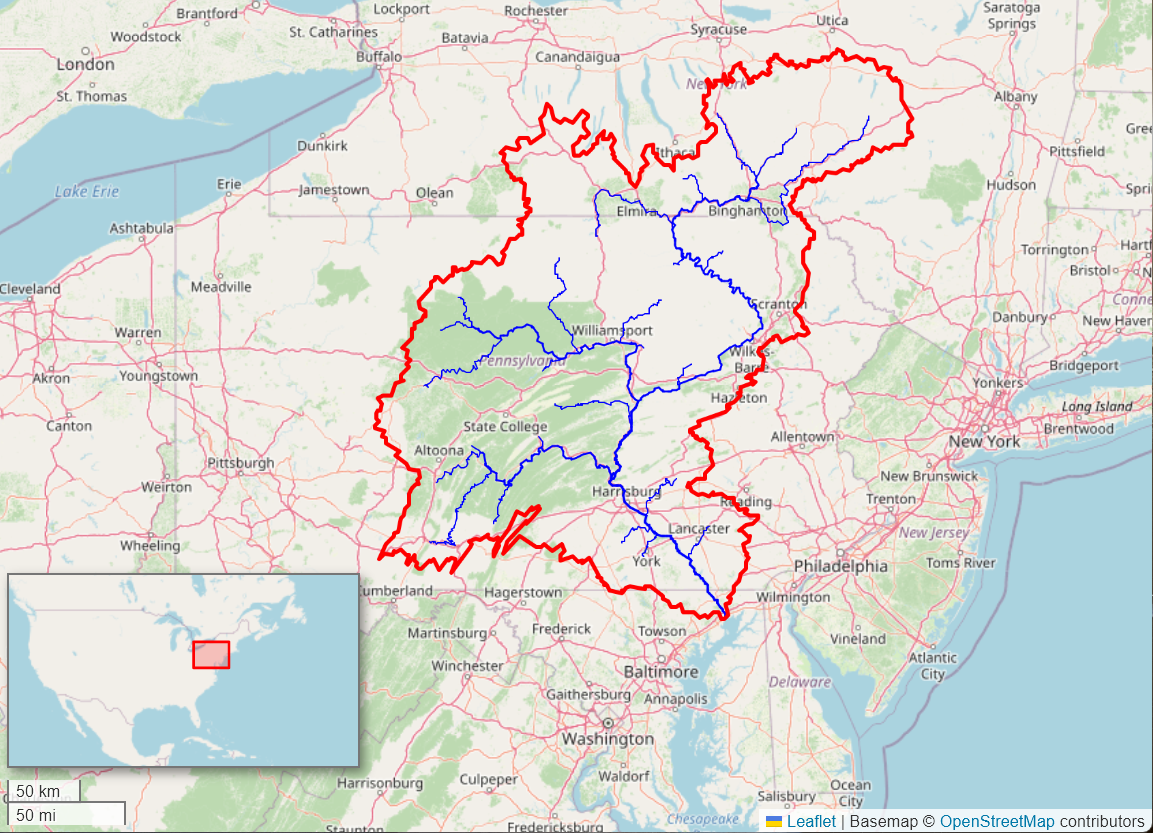
Map of the Susquehanna River watershed where the Scahentoarrhonon lived

Their ethnonym is variously recorded as Scahentarronon, Skahendawanehronon, Scahtowaneurhonon, Scahentowanenrhonons, Scahentoarronons, Scahentaorrhon and Scahentoarrhonons. They are referred to as big flats people or the people of the big flats, derived from the word Scahentoa. Scholars have recently argued that their name translates to the "Nation of the Great Meadow."

Early ethnographers William N. Fenton and J. N. B. Hewitt considered the Scahentoarrhonon to have been the same as the Massawomeck due to their names both meaning "big grassy flat." This hypothesis contradicts the historical records that usually place the Massawomeck far inland from the Susquehanna River and the increasing archaeological evidence for the association of the Monongahela culture with the Massawomeck. The Massawomeck-Scahentoarrhonon connection also contradicts current archaeological findings, which indicate the Wyoming Valley was abandoned in the 1525-1550 period, possibly due to a Susquehannock migration. Archaeological evidence for habitation in the Wyoming Valley hasn't yet been found for the period between 1550 and 1720. However, this also contradicts multiple historical documents, such as the Jesuit Relations, implying residents, foreign relations and towns in the broader Wyoming Valley region.

The Scahentoarrhonon have also been argued to be the same as the Conestoga, Antouahonaron, Andoouanchronon, Akhrakvaerton, Carantouannais, Andaste, Cockhandeenrhonons, the Skenchiohronons and the Susquehannock.

== History ==
In the early and middle 1900s, it was argued the Scahentoarrhonons were the same people as the Massawomeck raiders known to the Powhatan Confederacy and the British colonists in Virginia, however, this has been abandoned as a hypothesis.

Little is known of the Scahentoarrhonon and much of their history is reconstructed by connecting them to other attested ethnonyms. They may have been allies or confederates with the Susquehannock or even just another name for them. They are stated to have had three towns, making them a not insignificant threat. They were allies with the Wendat Confederacy against the common threat of Haudenosaunee expansionism. In 1615, Champlain sent an embassy to them. At the time, the Scahentoarrhonon had contacts with the Dutch and 800 soldiers with whom they fought their neighbors to the south. They were recorded again in the Jesuit Relation for 1635. The text places them in the Wyoming Valley. They were destroyed by the Haudenosaunee Confederacy in 1652 during the Beaver Wars. To conquer them the Haudenosaunee launched a surprise attack in winter, capturing 500 to 600 adoptees from a total of 1,000 Scahentoarrhonon citizens. The Haudenosaunee only lost 130 soldiers of their army of 600. This attack was likely a preemptive attack due to a recent Scahentoarrhonon alliance with the Neutral Confederacy. Survivors were most probably individually adopted into one or more of the Five Nations. In the 1730s and 1740s the valley became inhabited by Lenape, Mohicans and Shawnee and became the site of Moravian missionary activities.

== See also ==
- Étienne Brûlé
- Jesuits
- New France
  - Pays d'en Haut
- New Sweden
- North American fur trade
- Other Iroquoian Peoples
  - Erie
  - Honniasont
  - Juniata
  - Tionontati Confederacy
  - Wenro
  - Westo
  - Wyandot

== Bibliography ==
- Hewitt, J. N. B. (1912). "Susquehanna". In Hodge, F. W. (ed.). Handbook of American Indians North of Mexico, Part 2 (Bureau of American Ethnology Bulletin 30). Washington: Government Printing Office. pp. 653–657.
