= Tockwogh =

Extinct Algonquian tribe

Tockwogh tribe
Total population
- Extinct as a tribe

Regions with significant populations
- United States (Maryland)

Languages
- Tockwogh

Related ethnic groups
- Susquehannock

The Tockwogh were an Algonquian tribe living in the region of the Sassafras River in what are now Cecil and Kent counties in Maryland. The name Tockwogh is a variation of tuckahoe, a water plant with bulbous roots used for food. The Tockwogh are extinct as a people. According to John Smith, they spoke a different language from all their neighbors, including the Chowanoc, Tuscarora, Lenape, Tutelo, Susquehannock Powhatan, Nanticoke, and Piscataway. He needed a interpreter who knew the Powhatan language to talk to the Tockwoghs.

== History ==
Captain John Smith's party first encountered the Tockwogh people in 1608 after being informed about them by the Massawomecks.

== Sources ==
- Rivers of the Eastern Shore - Seventeen Maryland Rivers by Hulbert Footner
