= Onojutta-Haga =

Native American people

The Onojutta-Haga or Juniata (Iotteca) people were Indigenous to areas adjacent to the Juniata River and its tributaries in the southern part of what is now Pennsylvania.

== History ==
The Onojutta-Haga, like many small bands of indigenous peoples of the interior of Pennsylvania, are very poorly known. By 1648 they were forced auxiliaries of the more powerful Susquehannock, an Iroquoian-speaking tribe, and may have ultimately been at least partially assimilated. When the Susquehannock were subjugated and dispersed from the Susquehanna Valley, the Onojutta-Haga were likely included in their number.

== Language ==
The Onojutta-Haga or Juniata were an Iroquoian-speaking group. They were part of a language and cultural family that also included the Erie people and, by 1722, the Six Nations of the Iroquois Confederacy, or Haudenosaunee. North of the Great Lakes, the Wyandot were also Iroquoian speaking.
