= Exploration of the Americas =

The exploration of the Americas includes:

- Exploration of North America
  - Age of Discovery § Exploring North America
  - Timeline of the European colonization of North America
  - Colonial history of the United States
- Exploration of South America
  - Age of Discovery#Inland Spanish expeditions (1519–1532)
- European colonization of the Americas
- Voyages of Christopher Columbus
