= Akhrakouaeronon =

Native American people of the Eastern Woodlands

The Akhrakouaeronon or Atrakouaehronon were an Indigenous people briefly mentioned in The Jesuit Relations. They may have been a subtribe of the Susquehannock. They lived in present-day Northumberland County, Pennsylvania on the east side of the Susquehanna River just below the confluence with the river's west branch. Their principal town was Atrakwaye. On John Smith's 1608 map it is referred to as Quadroque.
