= Susquehannock language =

Iroquoian language spoken in eastern US

Susquehannock
- Conestoga
- Native to: United States
- Region: New York, Pennsylvania, Maryland, West Virginia (Northeastern United States)
- Ethnicity: Susquehannock
- Era: attested 1640s
- Language family: Iroquoian: Northern; Lake Iroquoian; Five Nations; Susquehannock

Language codes
- ISO 639-3: sqn
- Glottolog: susq1241
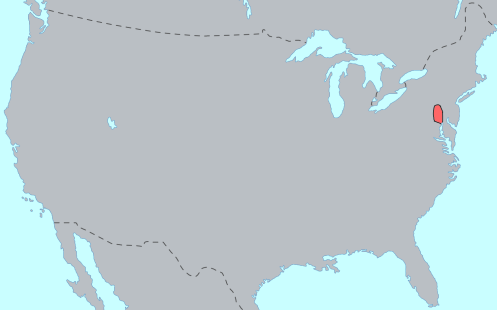
- Distribution of the Conestoga (Susquehannock) language

Susquehannock, also known as Conestoga, is an extinct Iroquoian language spoken by the Native American people variously known as the Susquehannock or Conestoga.

== Lexicon ==
Information about Susquehannock is scant. Almost all known words and phrases come from the Vocabula Mahakuassica, a vocabulary written by the Swedish missionary Johannes Campanius in New Sweden during the 1640s and published by his grandson Thomas Campanius Holm in two separate works in 1696 and 1702. Peter Stephen Du Ponceau translated the 1702 work from Swedish to English in 1834.

Campanius's vocabulary contains just over 100 words and phrases. Linguist Marianne Mithun believes this limited data is sufficient to classify Susquehannock as a Northern Iroquoian language, closely related to the languages of the Haudenosaunee Confederacy. Examples of Susquehannock-language place names include Conestoga, Juniata, and Swatara.

=== Toponyms ===
Place names in the Conestoga homeland are documented as of Conestoga origin. After 1763, some Conestoga remnant peoples joined nations of the Haudenosaunee Confederacy, and the Conestoga language survived for a time. Indian Villages and Place Names in Pennsylvania with Numerous Historical Notes and References (1928), a book by Dr. George P. Donehoo identifies place names derived from the Conestoga language.
