= Massawomeck people =

Historical Indigenous tribe of the Northeastern Woodlands

Massawomeck
Total population
- extinct (17th century)

Regions with significant populations
- Western Maryland; Eastern West Virginia; Pennsylvania

Languages
- Iroquoian

Religion
- Native

The Massawomeck were an Iroquoian people who lived in what is now western Maryland and eastern West Virginia during the early 17th century. Their territory encompassed the headwaters of the Monongahela, Youghiogheny and Potomac rivers.

== European contact ==
The first documented European contact with the Massawomeck occurred during John Smith's second exploration of the Chesapeake Bay in 1608. While crossing the mouth of the Elk River, Smith encountered a party of Massawomeck in canoes returning from a raid on the Tockwogh, an Algonquian people who lived on the east side of the Chesapeake. The Massawomeck cautiously approached Smith's boat, which eventually led to an exchange of gifts. The Tockwogh later reported that the Massawomeck were the "mortal enemies" of the Susquehannock who lived on the Susquehanna River north of the Chesapeake.

Smith had previously heard of the Massawomeck from Wahunsenacawh, leader of the Powhatan. Wahunsenacawh told Smith that the Massawomeck were a fierce people who lived on a sea beyond the mountains, "that did eate men," and had slain many during attacks against the Piscataway and Patawomeck a year earlier. Smith later interrogated a Manahoac prisoner who also reported that the Massawomeck lived on a great water.

The Massawomeck appear in the journal of English fur trader Henry Fleet. In June 1632, Fleet sent his brother Edward up the Potomac River to invite the Massawomeck to bring their furs to the Great Falls of the Potomac River and trade directly with him rather than through Nacotchtank (Anacostan) intermediaries. Edward was successful, and several groups of Massawomeck arrived at the falls that summer. Fleet recorded that the Massawomeck were a confederacy who lived in palisaded towns, one of which contained over 300 houses. Fleet's journal includes six Massawomeck words, five names, and a word of greeting (quo). Four of the words were names of Massawomeck settlements (Skaunetowa, Touhoga, Usserahak, Mosticum), and one name was of a non-Massawomeck group (Herecheenes).

On the Carte de la Nouvelle-France, dated c. 1641 and attributed to Jean Bourdon, and on Nicolas Sanson's 1656 map Le Canada ou Nouvelle France, a people called the "Antiovandarons" are located to the west of the Appalachians that may represent the Massawomeck.

== Historiographical and archaeological perspectives ==
Historical writers in the 19th century often identified the Massawomeck as either the Haudenosaunee (specifically the Seneca) or the Erie. It is now accepted, however, that although the Massawomeck were Iroquoian, they were culturally distinct from the Haudenosaunee and Erie. Early 20th-century ethnographers John Hewitt and William Fenton proposed that the Massawomeck were the Scahentoarrhonon, a tribe briefly mentioned in the Jesuit Relations. This hypothesis never received wide acceptance.

In 1991, James Pendergast of the Canadian Museum of History proposed that the Massawomeck were the Antouhonorons who Samuel de Champlain placed south of Lake Ontario on his map of 1632. Pendergast suggested that the Massawomeck had lived east of the Niagara River until conflict with the Haudenosaunee forced them to migrate south in the mid-1620s. This theory, however, fails to explain Smith's encounter with the Massawomeck on the Chesapeake Bay in 1608, nor does it account for significant Massawomeck aggression against the Algonquian peoples on the upper Chesapeake well before 1620. It also ignores the likelihood that when Champlain wrote about the Antouhonorons he was referring to the non-Mohawk tribes of the Haudenosaunee.

Recent research suggests that the Massawomeck were a people of the protohistoric Monongahela culture who inhabited the upper Youghiogheny River and Monongahela River watersheds. Some early 16th-century movement into the upper Potomac River watershed may also have occurred. Historical claims that the Massawomeck were a large confederacy have also gained archaeological support.

== Dispersal ==
Attacks by the Seneca are thought to have displaced the Massawomeck from their territory c. 1635, although drought may also have been a factor. Many Massawomeck refugees were absorbed by the Susquehannock where they became known to the Swedes and the Dutch as the Black Minqua. Other Massawomeck refugees may have pushed southward into Virginia where they were adopted by the Meherrin.
