= League of Armed Neutrality =

League of Armed Neutrality refers to one of two alliances of European naval powers (1780–1783 and 1800–1801), both intended to protect neutral shipping against the Royal Navy's wartime policy of unlimited search of neutral shipping for French contraband. Accounts of the times also refer to these alliances simply as the Armed Neutrality.

- First League of Armed Neutrality, existed from 1780 to 1783 during the American War of Independence
- Second League of Armed Neutrality, existed from 1800 to 1801 during the Napoleonic Wars
- Third League of Armed Neutrality, a proposed but never adopted alliance between Britain and France during the American Civil War
