= 2026 in Pennsylvania =

- Decades: 2000s; 2010s; 2020s
- See also: History of Pennsylvania; Historical outline of Pennsylvania; List of years in Pennsylvania; 2026 in the United States

The following is a list of events of the year 2026 in Pennsylvania.

== Incumbents ==
=== State government ===
- Governor: Josh Shapiro (D)

== Events ==
=== January ===
- January 7 – The Pittsburgh Post-Gazette, Pittsburgh's largest newspaper, announces it will wind down operations in May after the newspaper's parent company Block Communications failed to reach a deal with the journalists' union.
- January 20 – Lehigh County evicts Immigration and Customs Enforcement from an office space in Allentown, citing unpaid rent.
- January 22 – The National Park Service removes exhibits at the President's House Site in Philadelphia that made reference to slavery.

=== March ===
- March 2 – Daphy Michel, a 31-year-old Haitian national is found dead in Pittsburgh, days after she was detained and released by Immigration and Customs Enforcement. Her death is later ruled a homicide.
- March 23 – ICE agents are deployed to 14 airports nationwide, including Philadelphia International Airport and Pittsburgh International Airport.
- March 27 – A Secret Service agent assigned to protect Jill Biden accidentally shoots himself in the leg at Philadelphia International Airport.
- March 31 – A federal judge orders the University of Pennsylvania to turn over a list containing the names of its Jewish employees and students as part of an Equal Employment Opportunity Commission probe of alleged antisemitism at Penn.

=== April ===
- April 5 – The Gannon Golden Knights beat the Lander Bearcats 84–61 to win the 2026 NCAA Division II men's basketball tournament. It is their first title.
- April 9 – The Women's National Basketball Association announces an expansion team in Philadelphia, set to begin play in 2030.
- April 14 – The Venetoulis Institute, the non-profit owner of The Baltimore Banner, announces it will acquire the Pittsburgh Post-Gazette and allow it to keep publishing.
- April 19 – A woman and her six children are killed in a gas explosion in Lamar Township.
- April 23–25 – The 2026 NFL Draft is held in Pittsburgh. The Las Vegas Raiders choose Fernando Mendoza from Indiana as the first overall draft pick.

=== May ===
- May 14–17 – The 2026 PGA Championship is held at Aronimink Golf Club in Newtown Square. Aaron Rai wins the tournament, his first major championship victory.

=== June ===
- June 11–July 19 – The United States hosts the 2026 FIFA World Cup, with a number of matches being held in Lincoln Financial Field in Philadelphia.
- June 18 – The minor-league York Revolution forfeit a game against the Southern Maryland Blue Crabs after the majority of Revolution players refuse to wear rainbow sleeves for Pride Night.

=== July ===
- July 14 – The 2026 Major League Baseball All-Star Game is held at Citizens Bank Park in Philadelphia.
- July 29 – The University of Valley Forge in Phoenixville announces it will be closing at the end of the Summer 2026 semester.

=== August ===
- August 12 – A man donning a "Chucky-style horror mask" chases and harasses several people in Philadelphia. A 22-year-old suspect is later arrested in Las Vegas.
- August 17 – 14 people, including 13 Pennsylvania State University students, are arrested and accused of running a drug ring that packaged cocaine at off-campus fraternity houses and sold drugs to Penn State students.
- August 19 – A Cessna 150 strikes a Pennsylvania State Police helicopter while landing at Carlisle Airport in Carlisle. The Cessna pilot is killed and two state troopers are injured.
- August 19–30 – The 2026 Little League World Series is held in South Williamsport.
- August 23 – An Upper Pottsgrove Township Police officer fatally shoots unarmed college student Glen Pysher while responding to an attempted break-in call. Pysher had been drinking with friends and had mistaken the home for his friend's. The officer is later charged with manslaughter.
- August 25 – The state reports two people died of measles in Lancaster County, the first deaths in the 2026 Pennsylvania measles outbreak.

=== September ===
- September 15 – Federal judge Paul S. Diamond disqualifies Philadelphia District Attorney Larry Krasner and ADA Matthew Stiegler from participating in the case of Dennis Johnson, who is seeking to have his murder conviction overturned. Diamond also recommends that the United States Department of Justice investigate if Krasner committed any crimes in relation to the case.
- September 16 – The Philadelphia Police Department announce that seven women reported missing over the previous decade are believed to be connected to a house owned by photographer R. C. Hörsch, who died in 2025. The investigation began in June after Hörsch's son Eugene was found with one of the women, who had been missing since 2023. Of the remaining six, which includes R. C. Hörsch's ex-wife, police believe five are deceased, though no bodies have been found. In the home, police report finding over a million images, including some that show women who appear to be unconscious or dead.
- September 21 – Flights are grounded at Philadelphia International Airport after an Amtrak construction crew accidentally cuts a fiber line in New Jersey, causing a telecom outage.

=== October ===
- October 1 – A shooting leaves three teenagers injured near a stadium in Pittsburgh.
- October 9 – Eight people, including two children, are killed in a mass shooting at a home in Erie. The shooter kills themselves in the home after a police stand-off.

=== November ===
- November 3 –
  - 2026 Pennsylvania House of Representatives election
  - 2026 Pennsylvania Senate election: Democrats win the majority of seats, forming a Democratic trifecta for the first time in 30 years.
  - 2026 Pennsylvania gubernatorial election: Josh Shapiro wins reelection.
  - 2026 United States House of Representatives elections in Pennsylvania

== Sports ==
- 2025–26 Philadelphia 76ers season
- 2025–26 Philadelphia Flyers season
- 2025–26 Pittsburgh Penguins season
- 2026 Philadelphia Eagles season
- 2026 Pittsburgh Steelers season
- 2026 Philadelphia Phillies season
- 2026 Pittsburgh Pirates season
- 2026 Philadelphia Union season

== See also ==
- 2026 in the United States
