= 2027 in Pennsylvania =

- Decades: 2000s; 2010s; 2020s
- See also: History of Pennsylvania; Historical outline of Pennsylvania; List of years in Pennsylvania; 2027 in the United States

The following is a list of events of the year 2027 in Pennsylvania.

== Events ==
=== Planned or predicted ===
- November 2 -
  - 2027 Philadelphia City Council election
  - 2027 Philadelphia mayoral election

== See also ==
List of festivals in Pennsylvania
