= League of Neutrality =

League of Neutrality may refer to:

- First League of Armed Neutrality
- Second League of Armed Neutrality
