= 1776 in Pennsylvania =

- Decades: 1750s; 1760s; 1770s; 1780s; 1790s
- See also: History of Pennsylvania; Historical outline of Pennsylvania; List of years in Pennsylvania; 1776 in the United States

This is a list of events in the year 1776 in Pennsylvania.

== Incumbents ==
- Colonel Governor: John Penn (1773–1776)

== Events ==
- January 2 – The Tory Act of 1776 is signed by Peyton Randolph.
- June 18–25 – The Pennsylvania Provincial Conference takes place at Carpenters' Hall in Philadelphia declaring Pennsylvania independent from Great Britain.
- July 4 – Henry Beeson published a plat of quarter-acre plots near his mill in Union now Uniontown.
- August 23 – The 12th Pennsylvania Regiment is raised at Sudbury.
- September 16 – The 11th Pennsylvania Regiment is authorized.
- September 28 – The Pennsylvania Constitution of 1776 is ratified.
- December 25 – American Revolution: At 6 p.m. Gen. George Washington and his troops, numbering 2,400, march to McConkey's Ferry, cross the Delaware River, and land on the New Jersey bank by 3 a.m. the following morning.

=== Undated ===
- The last colonel governor John Penn resigns.
- The Continental Powder Works at French Creek is constructed in East Pikeland Township.
- Crawford Township is settled.
- The Dobbin House Tavern is established becoming the oldest building in Gettysburg.

== Births ==
- January – Matthew Brown, Presbyterian minister (d. 1853)
- January 3 – Thomas Morris, politician (d. 1844)
- January 5 – Daniel Dobbins, sailing master in the United States Navy and captain in the United States Revenue Cutter Service (d. 1856)
- January 13 – John M. Snowden, journalist, newspaper editor and politician (d. 1842)
- January 29 – Enoch Lewis, mathematician (d. 1856)
- February 12 – Mary Young Pickersgill, seamstress, and flagmaker (d. 1857)
- February 26 – Innis Green, politician, lawyer and judge (d. 1839)
- March 5 – Gerard Troost, Dutch-American medical doctor, naturalist, and mineralogist (d. 1850)
- March 17 – Joel Abbot, politician (d. 1824)
- March 19 – Philemon Beecher, Anglo-American attorney and legislator (d. 1839)
- April 3 – Harm Jan Huidekoper, businessman, philanthropist, essayist and lay theologian (d. 1854)
- April 25 – James Miller, lawyer, militia officer, farmer, and politician, first governor of Arkansas Territory (d. 1851)
- May 9 – Thomas Maguire, American-born Canadian Roman Catholic priest, vicar general and educator (d. 1854)
- May 31 – John E. Hamm, American US Army colonel, doctor and politician, diplomat, industrialist, and Marshall of the State of Ohio (d. 1864)
- June 1 – George Schetky, composer (d. 1831)
- July 10 – Samuel Powell, politician (d. 1841)
- July 29 – James McSherry, politician (d. 1849)
- August 15 – Rees Hill, army colonel and politician (d. 1852)
- September 16 – Langdon Cheves, politician, lawyer and businessman (d. 1857)
- October 10 – John Hahn, politician (d. 1823)
- October 14 – Samuel Rexford, politician (d. 1857)
- October 21 – George Izard, soldier and politician, second governor of Arkansas Territory (d. 1828)
- November 10 – Samuel Gross, politician (d. 1839)
- December 6 – Theodorick Bland, attorney and statesman (d. 1846)
- December 10 – David Marchand, physician, Military personnel and politician (d. 1832)
- December 30 – William Drayton, politician, banker, and writer (d. 1846)

=== Undated ===
- James M. Broom, lawyer and politician (d. 1850)
- William Charles, Scottish-born engraver (d. 1820)
- Jacob Eichholtz, painter (d. 1842)
- William C. Frazer, lawyer and judge (d. 1838)
- Peter Gilles, violoncellist (d. 1839)
- John Gloucester, first African American to become an ordained Presbyterian minister in the United States (d. 1822)
- John Henry, spy and adventurer (d. 1853)
- Hetty Reckless, runaway slave (d. 1888)

== Deaths ==
- March 26 – Samuel Ward, farmer, and politician, 31st and 33rd Governor of the Colony of Rhode Island and Providence Plantations (b. 1725)
- June 29 – Richard Wickes, military personnel (b. Unknown)
- July 10 – Richard Peters, attorney, Anglican minister, and civil servant (b. 1704)
- July 27 – Joseph Wharton, merchant (b. 1707)
- October 9 – Philip Vickers Fithian, tutor (b. 1747)
- December 29 – Pluggy, Mingo chieftain

=== Undated ===
- Hetty Benbridge, painter (b. unknown)

== See also ==
- 1776 in the United States
- List of years in Pennsylvania
