= 2023 in Pennsylvania =

- Decades: 2000s; 2010s; 2020s
- See also: History of Pennsylvania; Historical outline of Pennsylvania; List of years in Pennsylvania; 2023 in the United States

The following is a list of events of the year 2023 in Pennsylvania.

== Incumbents ==
=== State government ===
- Governor: Tom Wolf (D) (until January 17), Josh Shapiro (D) (starting January 17)

== Events ==
- March 24 – 2023 Pennsylvania chocolate factory explosion: Seven people are killed and many others are injured after an explosion at a chocolate factory in West Reading.
- June 11 – 2023 Interstate 95 highway collapse: A section of Interstate 95 in Philadelphia collapses after a tanker truck catches fire under an overpass.
- June 16 – Pittsburgh synagogue shooting: The gunman in the 2018 Pittsburgh synagogue shooting in Pennsylvania, the deadliest antisemitic attack in U.S. history, is found guilty on 63 charges.
- July 3 – 2023 Kingsessing, Philadelphia shooting: Five people are killed and two others are injured in a shooting spree in Philadelphia,
- August 12 – Four people are killed and one other injured following a house explosion in Allegheny that destroyed three structures and damaged at least a dozen others.
- September 13 – Escaped U.S. fugitive Danilo Cavalcante is captured in Pennsylvania by a team of tactical officers after a two-week manhunt.

== See also ==
- 2023 in the United States
- List of years in Pennsylvania
