= Tory Act of 1776 =

1776 Continental Congress resolutions concerning American Loyalists

- Long title: The Tory Act : published by order of the Continental Congress, Philadelphia, Jan. 2, 1776.
- Effective: January 2, 1776

Tory Act of 1776 was penned as seven resolutions passed by the Second Continental Congress in Philadelphia, Pennsylvania on January 2, 1776. The legislative resolutions emphasized the American Patriots opposing sentiments towards the colonial political factions, better known as British America's Tories or Royalists.

== Tory Resolutions of 1776 ==
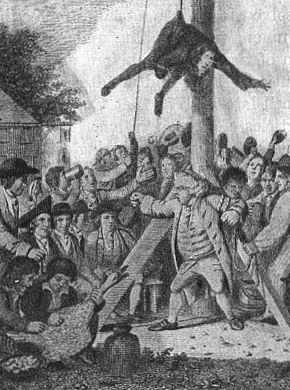
Tories subjected to hanging and mobbing without trial while others were tarred and feathered.

Before and during the American Revolution, the Colonial Tories sustained eminent admiration for the British Crown, Parliament of Great Britain, and unwavering loyalism for Great Britain's King George III.

=== January 2, 1776: Tory Resolution by the Second Continental Congress ===
Whereas it has been represented to this Congress, that divers honest and well-meaning, but uninformed people in these colonies, have, by the art and address of ministerial agents, been deceived and drawn into erroneous opinions respecting the American cause, and the probable issue of the present contest:

Resolved, That it be recommended to the different committees, and other friends to American liberty, in the said colonies, to treat all such persons with kindness and attention; to consider them as the inhabitants of a country determined to be free, and to view their errors as proceeding rather from want of information than want of virtue or public spirit; to explain to them the origin, nature and extent of the present controversy; to acquaint them with the fate of the numerous petitions presented to his Majesty, as well by assemblies as Congresses, for reconciliation and redress of grievances: and that the last from this Congress, humbly requesting the single favour of being heard, like all the others, has proved unsuccessful; to unfold to them the various arts of administration to ensnare and enslave us, and the manner in which we have been cruelly driven to defend, by arms, those very rights, liberties and estates, which we and our forefathers had so long enjoyed unmolested in the reigns of his present Majesty's predecessors. And it is hereby recommended to all conventions and assemblies in these colonies, liberally to distribute among the people, the proceedings of this and the former Congress, the late speeches of the great patriots in both houses of parliament relative to American grievances, and such other pamphlets and papers as tend to elucidate the merits of the American cause, the Congress being fully persuaded that the more our right to the enjoyment of our ancient liberties and privileges is examined, the more just and necessary our present opposition to ministerial tyranny will appear.

And, with respect to all such unworthy Americans, as, regardless of their duty to their Creator, their country and their posterity, have taken part with our oppressors, and, influenced by the hope or possession of ignominious rewards, strive to recommend themselves to the bounty of administration, by misrepresenting and traducing the conduct and principles of the friends of American liberty, and opposing every measure formed for its preservation and security.

Resolved, That it be recommended to all the United Colonies, to aid each other (on request from their respective Assemblies, conventions, committees, or councils of safety and county committees) on every emergency, and to cultivate, cherish and increase the present happy and necessary union, by a continual interchange of mutual good offices.

And whereas the execrable barbarity, with which this unhappy war has been conducted on the part of our enemies, such as burning our defenceless towns and villages, exposing their inhabitants, without regard to sex or age, to all the miseries which loss of property, the rigor of the season, and inhuman devastation can inflict, exciting domestic insurrections and murders, bribing the savages to desolate our frontiers, and casting such of us as the fortune of war has put in their power, into gaols, there to languish in irons and in want, compelling the inhabitants of Boston, in violation of the treaty, to remain confined within the town, exposed to the insolence of the soldiery, and other enormities, at the mention of which decency and humanity will ever blush, may justly provoke the inhabitants of these colonies to retaliate.

Resolved, That it be recommended to them, to continue mindful that humanity ought to distinguish the brave, that cruelty should find no admission among a free people, and to take care that no page in the annals of America be stained by a recital of any action which justice or Christianity may condemn, and to rest assured that whenever retaliation may be necessary or tend to their security, this Congress will undertake the disagreeable task.

Resolved, That the Assemblies, conventions, or committees, or councils of safety, be requested forthwith to transmit to this Congress, copies of all the petitions, memorials, and remonstrances, which have been, by the respective colonies, presented to the throne, or either house of parliament, since the year 1762, and that they also inform the Congress, whether any and what answers were given to them.

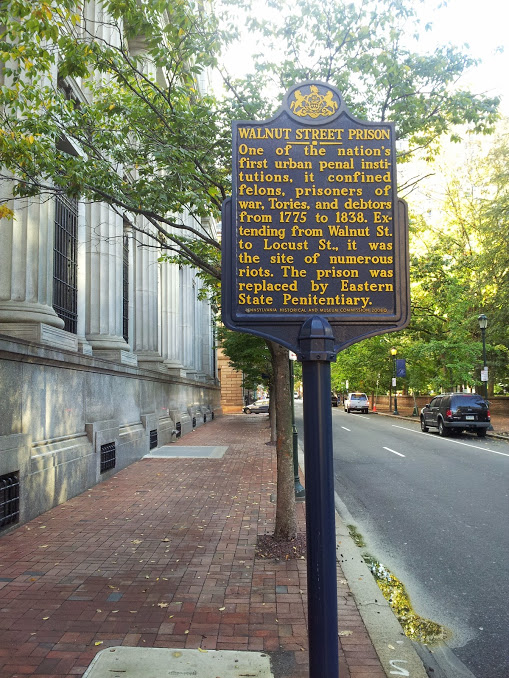
Pennsylvania historical marker citing the location of Philadelphia's Walnut Street Prison

=== March 14, 1776: Tory Resolution by the Second Continental Congress ===
Resolved, That it be recommended to the several assemblies, conventions, and councils or committees of safety of the United Colonies, immediately to cause all persons to be disarmed within their respective colonies, who are notoriously disaffected to the cause of America, or who have not associated, and shall refuse to associate, to defend, by arms, these United Colonies, against the hostile attempts of the British fleets and armies; and to apply the arms taken from such persons in each respective colony, in the first place to the arming the continental troops raised in said colony; in the next, to the arming such troops as are raised by the colony for its own defence, and the residue to be applied to the arming the associators; that the arms when taken be appraised by indifferent persons, and such as are applied to the arming the continental troops, be paid for by Congress, and the residue by the respective assemblies, conventions, or councils, or committees of safety.

=== June 18, 1776: Tory Resolution by the Second Continental Congress ===
Resolved, That no man in these colonies, charged with being a tory, or unfriendly to the cause of American liberty, be injured in his person or property, or in any manner whatever disturbed, unless the proceeding against him be founded on an order of this Congress, or the Assembly, convention, council or committee of safety of the colony, or committee of inspection and observation, of the district wherein he resides; provided, that this resolution shall not prevent the apprehending any person found in the commission of some act destructive of American liberty, or justly suspected of a design to commit such act, and intending to escape, and bringing such person before proper authority for examination and trial.

== See also ==
- Allegiance
- Loyalists fighting in the American Revolution
- British North America
- Massachusetts Spy
- Committee of Secret Correspondence
- Nova Scotia in the American Revolution
- Committee of Sixty
- Olive Branch Petition
- Diplomacy in the American Revolutionary War
- Petition to the King
- Evacuation Day of 1776
- Proclamation of Rebellion
- Evacuation Day of 1783
- Six Nations
- Expulsion of the Loyalists
- The American Crisis
- High Tory
- To the Inhabitants of America
- Kings Mountain Military Park
- United Empire Loyalist
- Letters to the inhabitants of Canada
- Vindication of the Measures of Congress
- Culper Ring
- Intelligence in the American Revolutionary War
- Mersereau Ring
- American Espionage & Informants
- British Espionage & Informants
- Colonial Revolutionary Espionage
