= Diplomacy in the American Revolutionary War =

Role of Diplomacy in American Independence

Diplomacy was central to the outcome of the American Revolutionary War and the broader American Revolution. Before the outbreak of armed conflict in April 1775, the Thirteen Colonies and Great Britain had initially sought to resolve their disputes peacefully from within the British political system. Once open hostilities began, the war developed an international dimension, as both sides engaged in foreign diplomacy to further their goals, while governments and nations worldwide took interest in the geopolitical and ideological implications of the conflict.

American diplomacy focused primarily on securing assistance to counter Great Britain's greater strategic, military, and manpower advantages; the British, who generally regarded the conflict as a civil war, prioritized containing these diplomatic overtures while also leveraging relations with various Native American tribes and German states.

In November 1775, the American Continental Congress established the Committee of Secret Correspondence as a de facto foreign ministry to garner international support and clandestine aid. Upon declaring independence in July 1776, the United States asserted its "international legal sovereignty", pursuing a formal and independent foreign policy that prioritized political legitimacy through diplomatic recognition; the Committee of Secret Correspondence became the Committee for Foreign Affairs in April 1777. Several key American political leaders—mostly notably Benjamin Franklin, Thomas Jefferson, John Adams, and James Madison—served in varying capacities as diplomats during the war.

Contemporaneous observers, including many founders of the United States, as well as subsequent historians, recognized that American diplomacy was integral to the success American Revolutionary. Alliances with several foreign powers—particularly France and Spain—provided decisive war material, funds, and troops while also isolating Britain globally and spreading thin its military; the decisive Battle of Yorktown in 1781, which essentially ended the war in the United States' favor, was won largely with the help of French troops and naval forces.

By contrast, by the start of the revolutionary war, Great Britain had become diplomatically isolated following years of conflict and hostility with most European powers; its inability to muster international support, coupled with the Americans' exploitation of widespread antipathy towards the British, was a major factor in its defeat.

== Diplomacy of the Continental Congress ==
Before the Revolutionary war, extra-colonial relations were handled in London, where the individual colonies dispatched agents on their own behalf. The colonies were subject to European peace settlements, settlements with Indian tribes, and inter-colony (between colonies) agreements.

Starting in 1772, several colonies formed Committees of Correspondence. Parliament enacted the Tea Act, in 1773, and after the Boston Tea Party, the Boston Port Act, Massachusetts Government Act, (or Intolerable Acts), in 1774. The Continental Congress established a Committee of Correspondence, which in 1789, became the Department of Foreign Affairs.

=== Conciliatory Resolution ===
Lord North took the uncharacteristic role of conciliator for the drafting of a resolution which was passed on February 20, 1775. It was an attempt to reach a peaceful settlement with the Thirteen Colonies immediately prior to the outbreak of the American Revolutionary War; it declared that any colony that contributed to the common defense and provided support for the civil government, and the administration of justice (i.e. against any anti-Crown rebellion) would be relieved of paying taxes or duties except those necessary for the regulation of commerce; it was addressed and sent to the individual colonies, and intentionally ignored the Continental Congress.

Lord North hoped to divide the colonists amongst themselves, and thus weaken any revolution/independence movements (especially those represented by the Continental Congress).

The resolution proved to be "too little, too late", and the American Revolutionary War began at Lexington, on April 19, 1775. The Continental Congress released a report—written by Benjamin Franklin, Thomas Jefferson, John Adams, and Richard Henry Lee—dated July 31, 1775, rejecting it.

=== Olive Branch Petition ===
When the Second Continental Congress convened in May 1775, most delegates followed John Dickinson in his quest to reconcile with George III of Great Britain. However, a smaller group of delegates led by John Adams believed that war was inevitable (or had already started) but remained quiet. This decision allowed John Dickinson, and his followers to pursue whatever means of reconciliation they wanted: the Olive Branch Petition was approved. It was first drafted by Thomas Johnson, but John Dickinson found the language too offensive, and he rewrote most of the document, although some of the conclusions remained. The letter was approved on 5 July, but signed and sent to London, on 8 July 1775. It appealed to George III by saying that the colonists were upset with ministerial policy, not the king's policies.

=== Letters to the inhabitants of Canada ===
In 1774, the British Parliament enacted the Quebec Act, along with other legislation that was labeled by American colonists as the Intolerable Acts. This measure guaranteed (among other things) the rights of French Canadians to practice Roman Catholicism.

The Letters to the inhabitants of Canada were three letters written by the First and Second Continental Congresses in 1774, 1775, and 1776 to communicate directly with the population of the Province of Quebec, formerly the French province of Canada, which had no representative system at the time. Their purpose was to draw the large French-speaking population to the American revolutionary cause. This goal ultimately failed, and Quebec, along with the other northern provinces of British America remained in British hands. The only significant assistance that was gained was the recruitment of two regiments totaling less than 1,000 men.

=== Envoys to France ===
In December 1775, Vergennes sent Julien Alexandre Achard de Bonvouloir, a secret messenger to sound out the Continental Congress. He met with the Committee of Secret Correspondence.

Early in 1776, Silas Deane was sent to France, by Congress in a semi-official capacity, to induce the French government to lend its financial aid to the colonies. On arriving in Paris, Deane at once opened negotiations with Vergennes, and Beaumarchais, securing through Roderigue Hortalez and Company, the shipment of many arms and munitions to America. He also enlisted the services of a number of Continental soldiers of fortune, among whom were Lafayette, Baron Johann de Kalb, Thomas Conway, Casimir Pulaski, and Baron von Steuben.

Arthur Lee, was appointed correspondent of Congress in London in 1775. He was dispatched as an envoy to Spain and Prussia to gain their support for the rebel cause. King Frederick the Great strongly disliked the British, and impeded its war effort in subtle ways, such as blocking the passage of Hessians. However, British trade was too important to lose, and there was risk of attack from Austria, so he pursued a peace policy and officially maintained strict neutrality. Spain was willing to make war on Britain but pulled back from full-scale support of the American cause because it intensely disliked republicanism, which was a threat to its Latin American Empire.

On October 26, 1776, Benjamin Franklin was dispatched to France as commissioner for the United States. Franklin remained in France until 1785.

== Foreign recognition ==
=== Dutch Republic ===
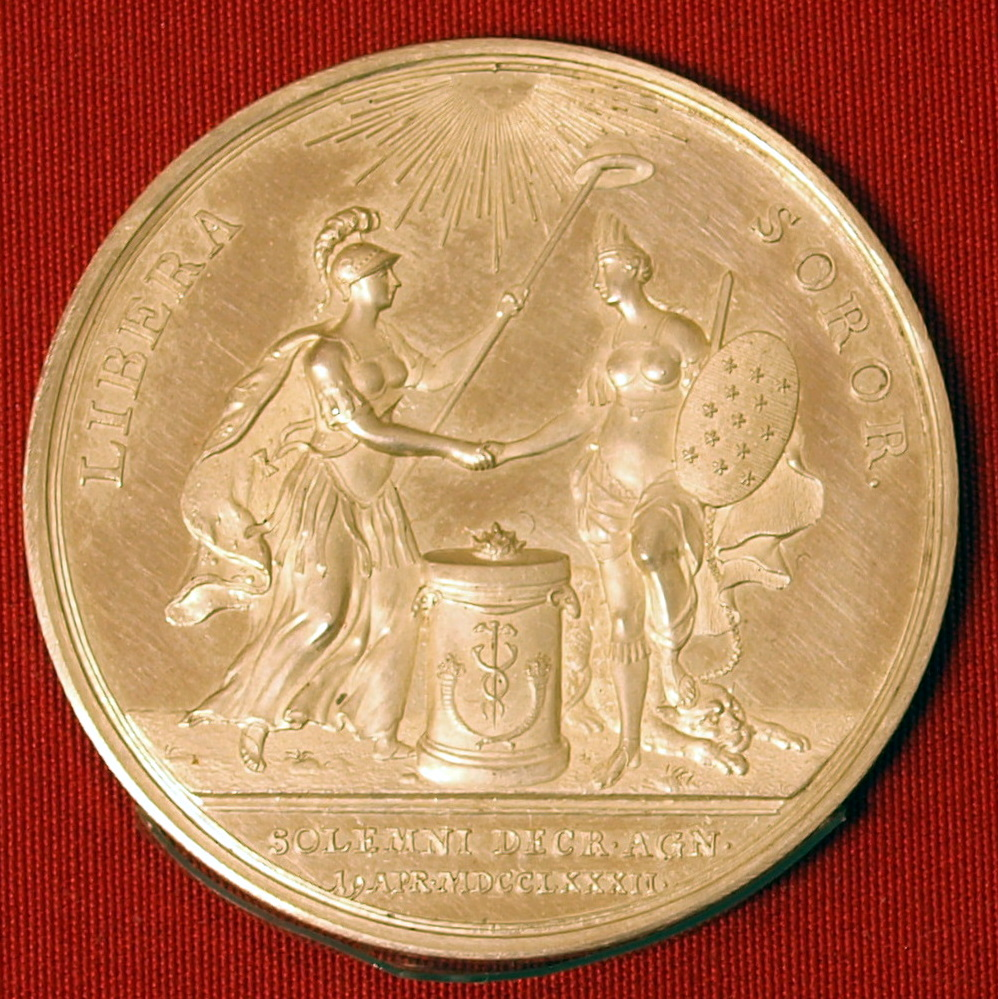
Coin minted for John Adams in 1782 to celebrate recognition of the United States as an independent nation by The Netherlands; one of three coins minted for John Adams in 1782 (on his ambassador status, on Dutch recognition of the US, and for the Dutch-US trade treaty); all three are in the coin collection of the Teylers Museum.

In 1776, the United Provinces was the first country to salute the flag of the United States, leading to growing British suspicions of the Dutch. In 1778, the Dutch refused to be bullied into taking Britain's side in the war. In the fall of 1779, Congress named Henry Laurens their minister to the Dutch Republic. In early 1780, he took up that post and successfully negotiated Dutch support for the war. On his return voyage to Amsterdam that fall, the Royal Navy a frigate intercepted the ship on which he was travelling, off the banks of Newfoundland. Although his dispatches were tossed overboard, they were retrieved by the British, who discovered the draft of a planned American-Dutch treaty prepared in Aix-la-Chapelle in 1778 by William Lee and the Amsterdam banker Jean de Neufville.

The Dutch were major suppliers of the Americans. In 13 months from 1778 to 1779, for example, 3,182 ships cleared the Dutch island of Sint Eustatius in the West Indies. When the British started to search all Dutch shipping for weapons for the rebels, the Republic officially adopted a policy of armed neutrality. Britain declared war in December 1780, before the Dutch could join the League of Armed Neutrality. This resulted in the Fourth Anglo-Dutch War.

In 1782, John Adams negotiated loans of $2 million for war supplies from Dutch bankers. On March 28, 1782, after a petition campaign on behalf of the American cause organised by Adams and the Dutch patriot politician Joan van der Capellen, the United Netherlands recognized American independence, and subsequently signed a treaty of commerce and friendship.

=== Morocco ===
Sultan Mohammed III of Morocco declared on 20 December 1777 that American merchant ships would be under the protection of the Sultan of Morocco and could thus enjoy safe passage. The Moroccan-American Treaty of Friendship in 1786 became the oldest non-broken U.S. friendship treaty.

=== France ===
The Treaty of Alliance was a pact between France and the Second Continental Congress, representing the United States government, ratified in May 1778.

Franklin, with his charm offensive, was negotiating with Vergennes, for increasing French support, beyond the covert loans and French volunteers. With the American victory at the Battle of Saratoga, the French formalized the alliance against their British enemy; Conrad Alexandre Gérard de Rayneval conducted the negotiations with the American representatives, Franklin, Silas Deane, and Arthur Lee. Signed on February 6, 1778, it was a defensive alliance where the two parties agreed to aid each other in the event of British attack. Further, neither country would make a separate peace with London, until the independence of the Thirteen Colonies was recognized.

The French strategy was ambitious, and even a large-scale invasion of Britain was contemplated. France believed it could defeat the British within two years.

In March 1778, Gérard de Rayneval sailed to America with d'Estaing's fleet; he received his first audience of Congress on August 6, 1778, as the first accredited Minister from France to the United States.

=== Lenape ===
The Treaty of Fort Pitt, also known as the Treaty with the Delawares (Lenape) or the Fourth Treaty of Pittsburgh, was signed on 17 September 1778 and was the first written treaty between the new United States of America and any American Indians—the Lenape in this case. Although many informal treaties were held with Native Americans during the American Revolution years of 1775–1783, this was the only one that resulted in a formal document. It was signed at Fort Pitt, Pennsylvania, site of present-day downtown Pittsburgh. It was essentially a formal treaty of alliance. It was largely unsuccessful as the majority of Indian tribes sided with the British.

=== Spain ===
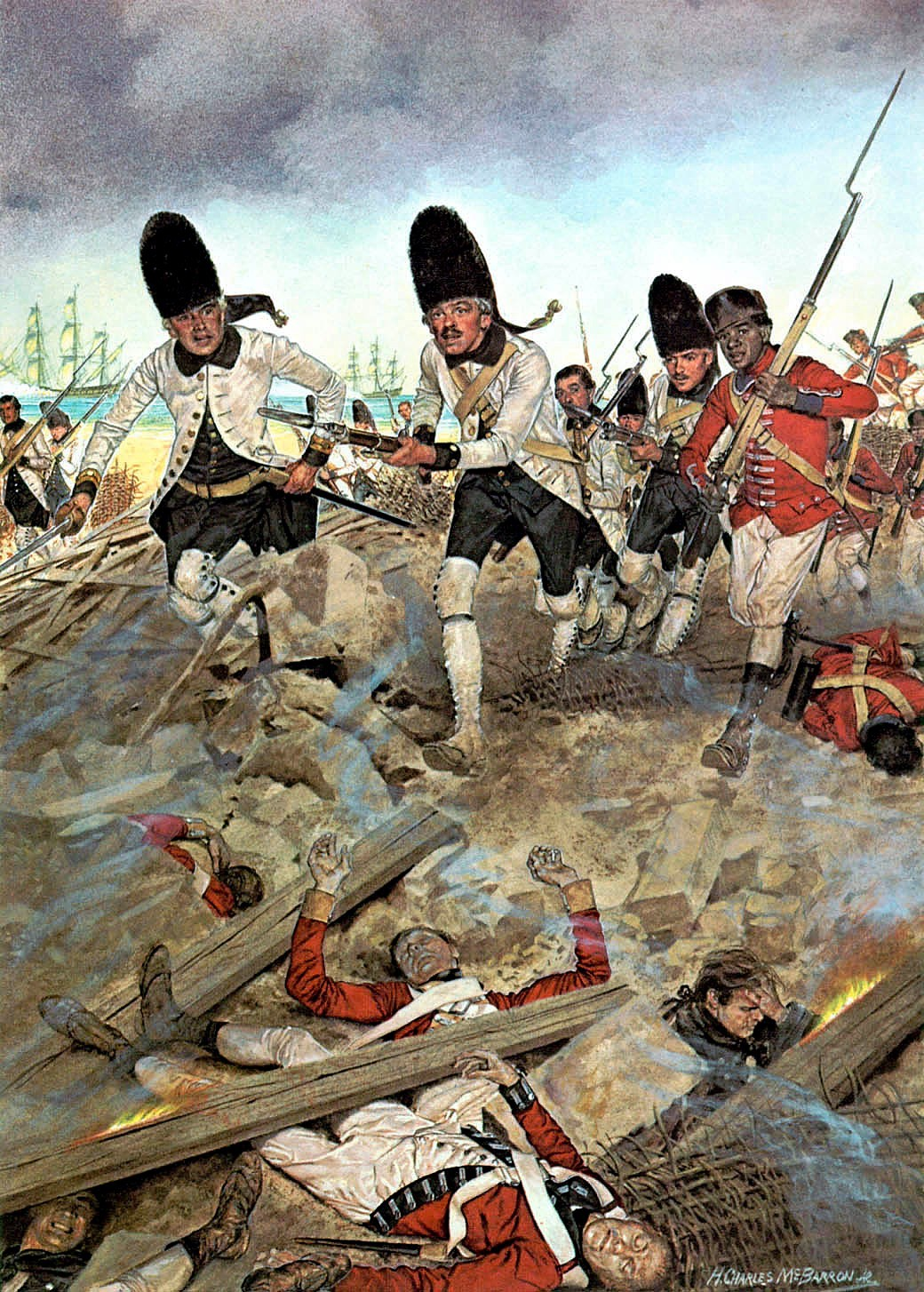
Spanish attack Pensacola; they cut British supply to southeastern Indian allies

In 1777, a new Prime Minister, José Moñino y Redondo, Count of Floridablanca had come to power, and had a reformist agenda that drew on many of the English liberal traditions. Spain's economy depended almost entirely on its colonial empire in the Americas, and due to unrest the reforms caused there among the native Creole aristocracy, the Spanish Court was worried about the US independence from colonial status because they had been held by another European Great Power. With such considerations in mind, Spain persistently rebuffed John Jay's attempts to establish diplomatic relations.

Though Spain was a co-belligerent with the Americans against the British, it did not recognize the United States' independence nor establish formal relations until nearly the end of the war. But the Spanish governor of Louisiana, Bernardo de Gálvez, had been informally cooperating with the Americans at the direction of the Spanish Court since at least 1776.

After France initiated its Anglo-French War of 1778-83, it invoked their Bourbon Family Compact with Spain, an alliance that had been in place since the Bourbons had become Spain's ruling dynasty in 1713. The secret Franco-Spanish Treaty of Aranjuez was signed on 12 April 1779. France agreed to aid Spain in the capture of British-held territory in Gibraltar adjacent Spain, East Florida, West Florida and the island of Menorca in the Mediterranean. On 21 June 1779, Spain declared war on Britain to join France, but it did not join the Franco-American alliance of 1778 that guaranteed US independence. Britain recognized the independence of the United States in the Treaty of Paris, officially ending the American Revolution, signed 3 Sept 1783. On the other hand, Spain was one of the last participants of wars against Britain to acknowledge the independence of the United States.

== British peace initiatives ==
=== Staten Island Peace Conference ===
The Staten Island Peace Conference was a brief and unsuccessful meeting designed to bring an end to the American Revolution. The conference took place on September 11, 1776, on Staten Island, New York.

In early September 1776, after the British victory at the Battle of Long Island, Admiral Lord Howe, having been appointed Acting Peace Commissioner by King George III, met with John Adams, Benjamin Franklin and Edward Rutledge to hold discussions. Lord Howe initially sought to meet the men as private citizens (he had known Franklin prior to the war), but he agreed to the Americans' demand that he recognize them as the official representatives of Congress. The Americans insisted for any negotiations to require British recognition of their independence. Lord Howe stated that he did not have the authority to meet their demand. The British resumed the campaign at the Landing at Kip's Bay.

The commission was mandated by the Crown to offer the rebel Americans pardons with some exceptions, to allow judges to serve on condition of good behaviour, and to promise to discuss colonial grievances (except the Quebec Act) in exchange for a ceasefire, the dissolution of the Continental Congress, the re-establishment of the prewar (traditional) colonial assemblies, the acceptance of Lord North's Conciliatory Proposal, and compensation for the Loyalists who had been adversely affected by the war.

=== Carlisle Peace Commission ===
In 1778, after the British defeat at Saratoga (concluded Oct. 17, 1777) and fearful of French recognition of American independence, Prime Minister Lord North had repealed (February 1778) the Tea Act and the Massachusetts Government Act. As far as the Americans were concerned, it was far too late.

A commission was sent to negotiate a settlement with the Americans and was organized by William Eden, with George Johnstone, and headed by Frederick Howard, 5th Earl of Carlisle. However, they left only after news of the Treaty of Alliance had reached London. Arriving in Philadelphia, the Commission sent a package of proposals to Congress. Among the terms of the commission, it was proposed:

More effectually to demonstrate our good intentions, we think proper to declare, even in this our first communication, that we are disposed to concur in every satisfactory and just arrangement towards the following among other purposes: To consent to a cessation of hostilities, both by sea and land. To restore free intercourse, to revive mutual affection, and restore the common benefits of naturalisation through the several parts of this empire. To extend every freedom to trade that our respective interests can require. To agree that no military force shall be kept up in the different states of North America, without the consent of the general congress, or particular assemblies. To concur in measures calculated to discharge the debts of America, and raise the value and credit of the paper circulation. To perpetuate our union, by a reciprocal deputation of an agent or agents from the different states, who shall have the privilege of a seat and voice in the parliament of Great Britain; or, if sent from Britain, to have in that case a seat and voice in the assemblies of the different states to which they may be deputed respectively, in order to attend to the several interests of those by whom they are deputed. In short, to establish the power of the respective legislatures in each particular state, to settle its revenue, its civil and military establishment, and to exercise a perfect freedom of legislation and internal government, so that the British states throughout North America, acting with us in peace and war, under our common sovereign, may have the irrevocable enjoyment of every privilege that is short of a total separation of interest, or consistent with that union of force, on which the safety of our common religion and liberty depends.

However, the British Army had left Philadelphia for New York, which stiffened the resolve of Congress to insist upon recognition of independence, a power that had not been given to the commission.

=== Clinton–Arbuthnot Peace Declaration ===
In December 1780, the commanders-in-chief of the British forces in North America, Sir Henry Clinton and Vice-Admiral Mariot Arbuthnot, were appointed as the Crown's commissioners "for restoring Peace to the Colonies and Plantations in North America, and for granting Pardon to such of his Majesty's Subjects now in Rebellion as shall deserve the Royal Mercy." The Patriots ignored it.

== Neutral countries and British isolation ==
Britain's diplomacy failed during the American Revolutionary War. Most of Europe was officially neutral, but the elites and public opinion typically favored the American insurgents, such as in Sweden, and Denmark. Britain not only could not find volunteer manpower to fill the ranks of an army in America to put down fellow Englishmen, internationally it had support of only a few small German states that hired out mercenaries directly to George III for his American service.

League of Armed Neutrality
enlightened despots for free trade
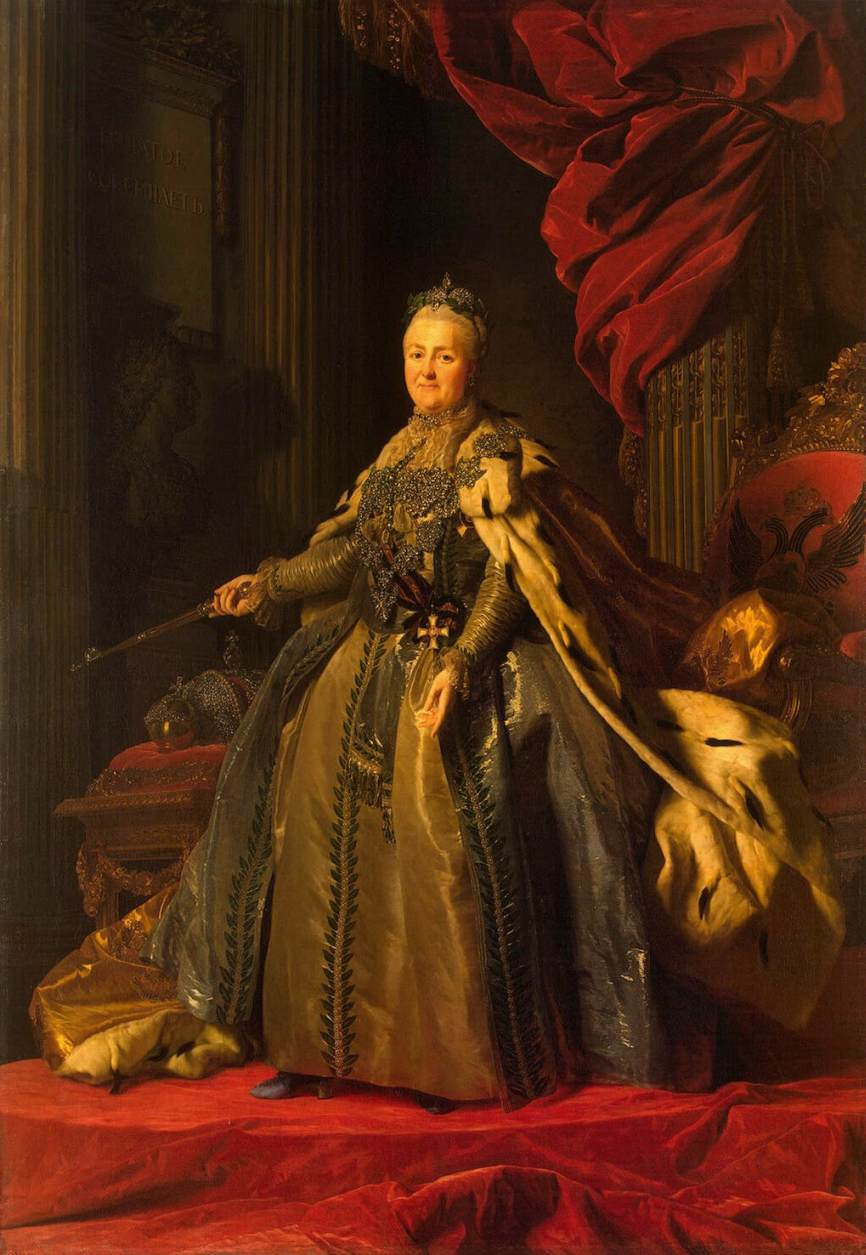
Catherine the Great
Russian Empire

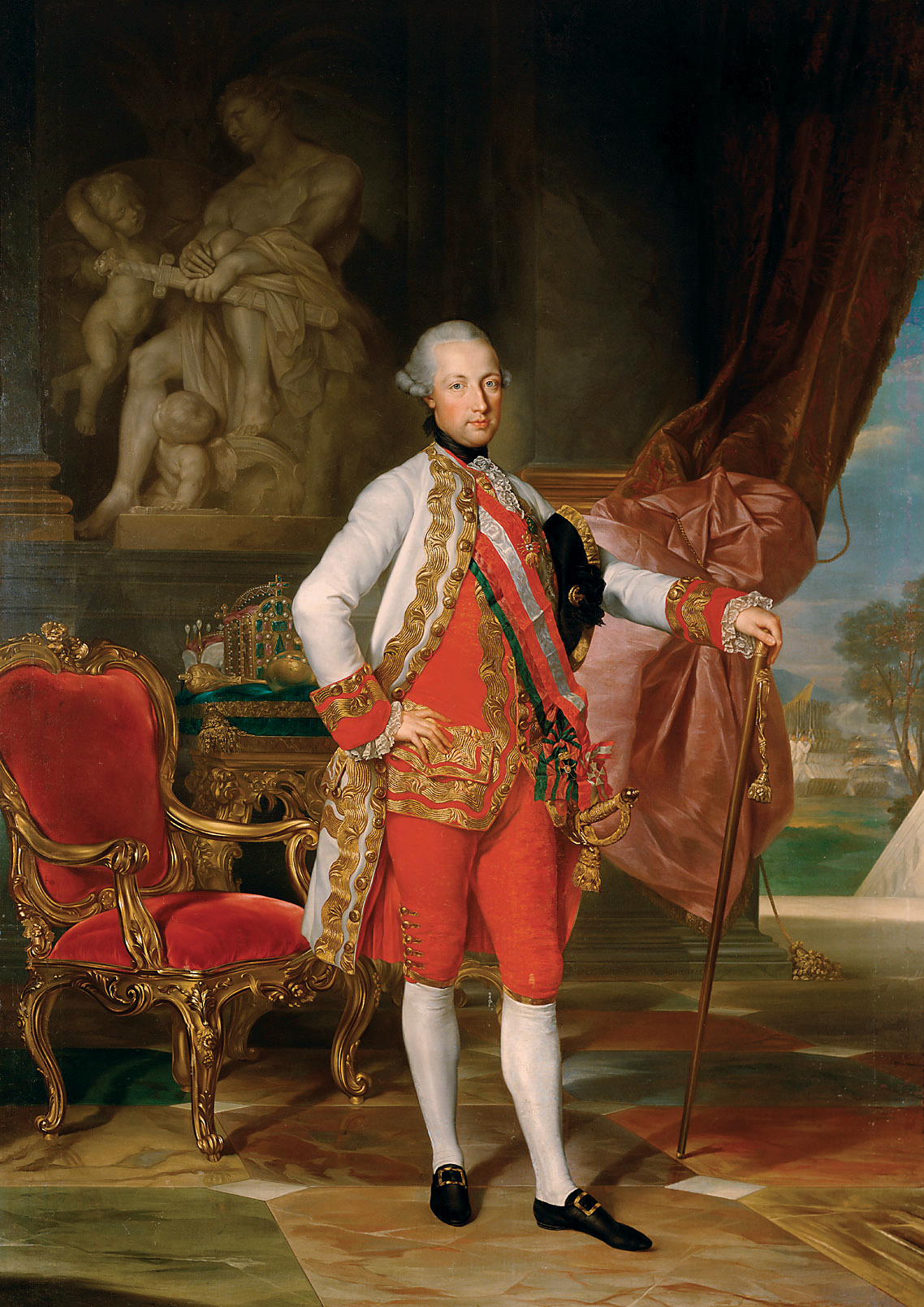
Joseph II
Austrian Empire

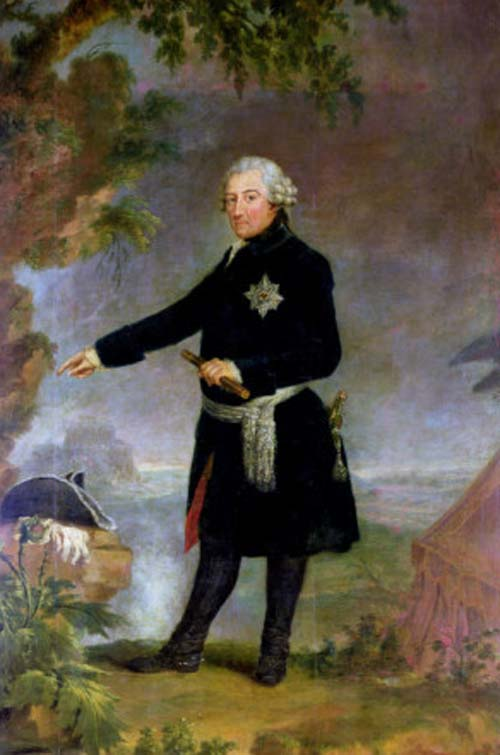
Frederick the Great
Kingdom of Prussia

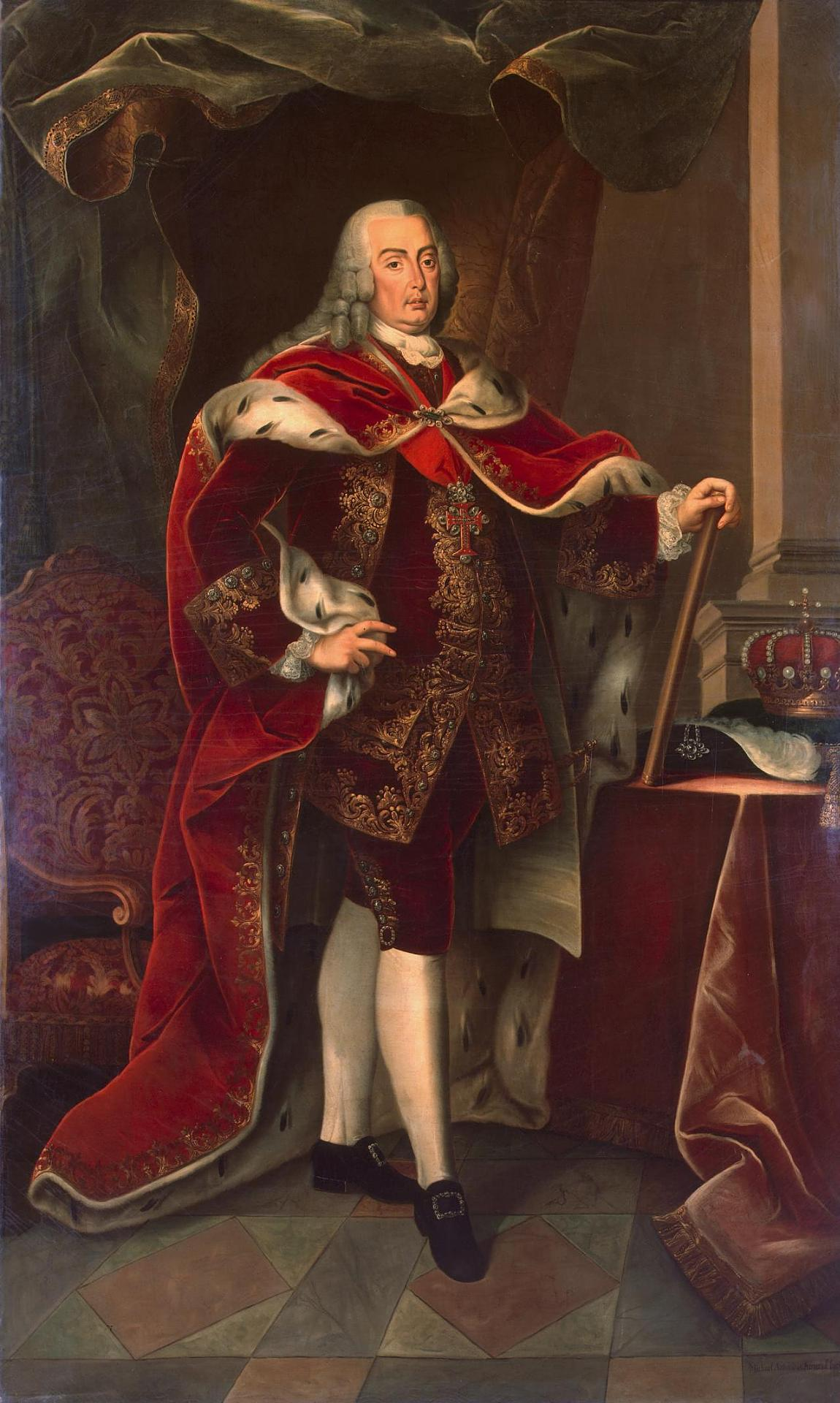
Joseph I
Kingdom of Portugal

The First League of Armed Neutrality was an alliance between 1780 and 1783 of the three eastern European Great Powers, all with Enlightenment monarchs. They furthered free trade by protecting neutral shipping against the British Royal Navy's Mercantilist policy to restrict trade in its rebelling colonies. British warships practiced unlimited searches, boarding neutral shipping to look for French contraband.Portugal, a close ally of Britain, did not want to be drawn into the conflict remained neutral in the war, after having lost to Spain in the Spanish-Portuguese War (1776-1777) when Britain was occupied with more pressing conflicts. Portugal joined the League.

Catherine the Great of Russia took the lead in establishing the 1780 League of Armed Neutrality with her declaration of Russian armed neutrality on 11 March (28 February, Old Style), 1780, during the War of American Independence. In it, she endorsed the right of neutral countries to trade by sea with nationals of belligerent countries without hindrance, except for weapons and military supplies. Russia would not recognize blockades of whole coasts, but only of individual ports, and only if a belligerent's warship were actually present or nearby.

Denmark and Sweden, accepting Russia's proposals for an alliance of neutrals, adopted the same policy towards shipping, and the three countries signed the agreement forming the League. They remained otherwise out of the war, but threatened joint retaliation for every ship of theirs searched by a belligerent. When the Treaty of Paris ended the Revolution with US independence in 1783, The Hapsburg (Austrian) Empire, Prussia, the Holy Roman Empire, the Dutch Republic, Portugal, the Two Sicilies and the Ottoman Empire had all become members. Austria was invited to act as a mediator between France and Great Britain during the American Revolution. John Adams traveled to Vienna in 1781 to lobby for American independence.

The League of the 1780s succeeded in the short run by enabling trade with the US during wartime, and it contributed to "freedom of the seas" as an international principle. Militarily, although the Russian navy dispatched three squadrons to the Mediterranean, Atlantic, and North Sea to enforce this decree, Catherine called the alliance an "armed nullity", because the British Navy outnumbered all member fleets combined. Nevertheless, Britain had no wish to antagonize Russia, and subsequently its fleets avoided interfering with League members shipping.

Diplomatically the League of Armed Neutrality carried even greater weight. France and the United States of America were quick to proclaim their adherence to the new principle of free neutral commerce. While both sides of the Fourth Anglo-Dutch War tacitly understood it as an attempt to keep the Netherlands out of the League, Britain did not officially regard the alliance as hostile.

The First League was followed in the Napoleonic Wars by the Second League of Armed Neutrality which was massively less successful and ended after the British victory at the Battle of Copenhagen.

== Peace of Paris ==
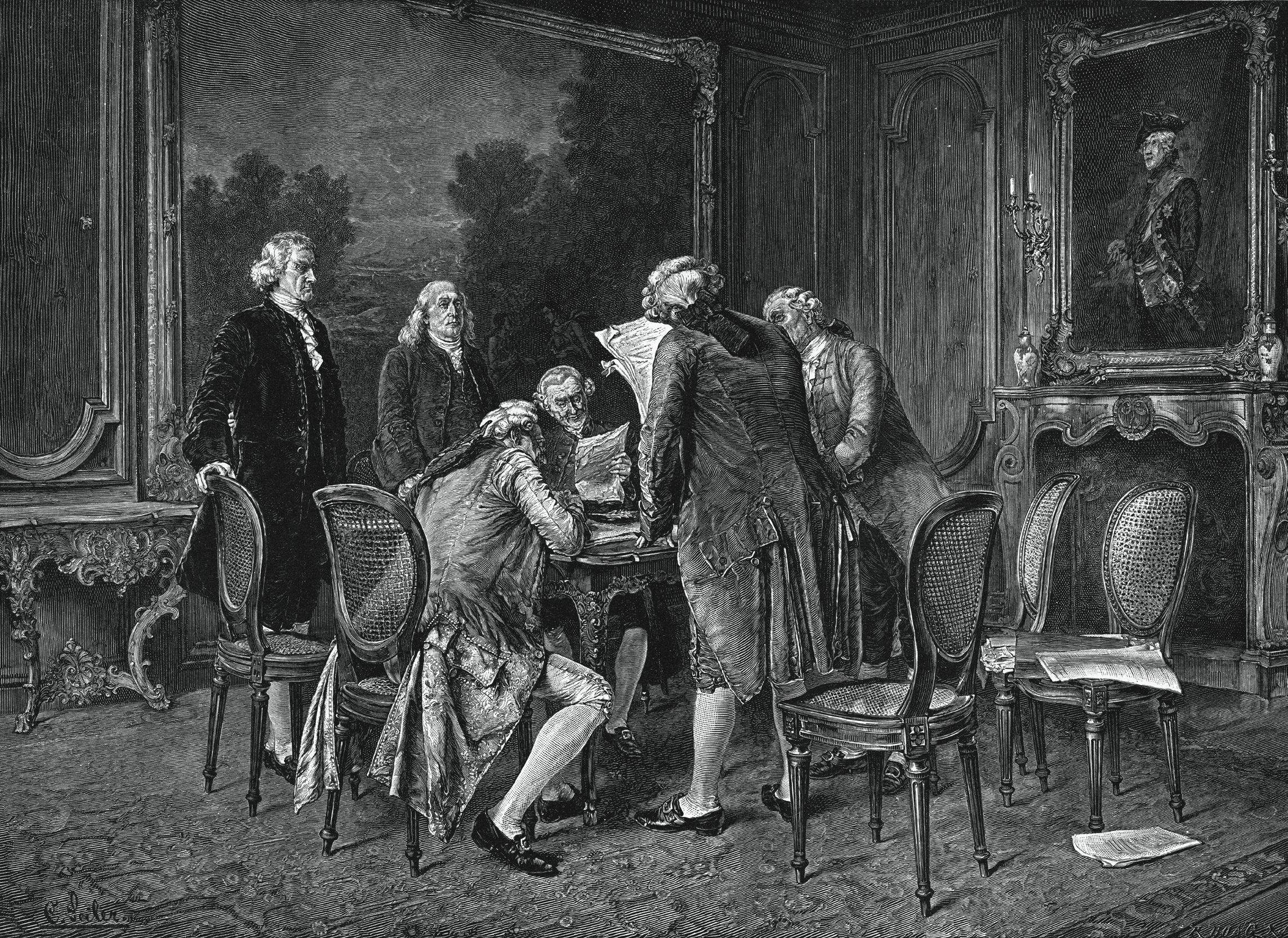
Signing of the preliminary Treaty of Paris, November 30, 1782

The Peace of Paris was the set of treaties which ended the American Revolutionary War. In June 1781, the Congress appointed Peace commissioners to negotiate with the British. On 30 November 1782, preliminary Articles of Peace are signed by Richard Oswald, with representatives of the United States of America.

=== The path to negotiation ===
News of the surrender of Lord Cornwallis at Yorktown reached Britain late in November 1781, shortly before Parliament was due to debate the military spending estimates for the following year. The hastily revised plan was to retain forces in America at their existing level, but to abandon the policy of "offensive" war, in favour of a new approach, of defense against French and Spanish attacks in the Caribbean, and Gibraltar.

=== The negotiation process ===
Therefore, the decision was made to build on the "no offensive war" policy, and begin peace talks with the Americans. First, the stated aim of the 1778 Treaty of Alliance between the United States and France was specifically to maintain the independence of the United States. Second, for well over a year, informal discussions had been held with Henry Laurens, an American envoy captured on his way to Amsterdam and imprisoned in a small two-room suite at the Tower of London. The British negotiator sent to Paris was the Scotsman Richard Oswald, a former business partner of Henry Laurens in the slave trade, who had been one of his visitors in the Tower of London. His first talks with Franklin led to a proposal that Britain should hand over Canada to the Americans.

=== British government changes again ===
On 1 July Lord Rockingham, the figurehead leader of the government, died, so Lord Shelburne was forced to take over, which led to the resignation of Fox, and a massive split in the anti-war Whig party in Parliament. Regardless of this, the remainder of the negotiations would be carried out under Shelburne's devious leadership (some of these negotiations took place in his study, now a bar in the Lansdowne Club). For example, he took advantage of the great delay in trans-Atlantic communication to send a letter to George Washington stating that Britain was accepting American independence without preconditions, while not authorising Richard Oswald to make any such promise when he returned to Paris to negotiate with Franklin and his colleagues (John Jay had by this time returned from Spain).

=== Diplomatic manoeuvres ===
Franklin became ill with gout towards the end of summer, but when John Jay learned in September of the secret French mission to England, by Joseph Matthias Gérard de Rayneval, and the French position on the fisheries, he sent a message to Shelburne himself, explaining in some detail why he should avoid being influenced too much by the French and Spanish. At the same time Richard Oswald was asking if the terms of his commission to negotiate with the Americans could be slightly reworded to acknowledge that the 13 so-called colonies referred to themselves as "United States", and about 24 September, the Americans received word that this had been done.

=== Great Powers at war and peace ===
The initial civil war between Great Britain and its rebelling thirteen colonies in Congress was broadened into a worldwide conflict between Britain and other European Great Powers. The English colonial insurgents in North America became the "centerpiece of an international coalition" to check and then compromise British preeminence in the North Atlantic. The rebelling Americans needed outside help if they were to be successful. Their "Continental" forces suffered repeated reverses early on. The cause of US independence flickered as its major port cities were either occupied or blockaded, its naval forces proved ineffectual, and its armies suffered repeated defeats in pitched battles at the hands of British regulars and their allied auxiliaries from German principalities.

Initially the Continental Congress persevered with financial contributions from the personal fortunes of the richest colonials to compensate for smaller states refusing to pay their full requisitions, It kept an army in the field by the leadership of George Washington and a flow of recruits from the largest states, especially Virginia, Massachusetts and Pennsylvania. Then came assistance from Dutch financiers and French covert military aid. French Enlightenment freebooters and European soldier-adventurers came to the aid of the embattled revolutionary forces. In 1778, the French Crown recognized the United States, in a trade treaty, followed by a defensive treaty that would become operative if Britain made war on France to interrupt its American trade. Article II of the military treaty included a French guarantee for US independence and it sovereign territory, including any territory conquered in Canada, Quebec, or Bermuda. Were Britain to initiate war with France for trading with the US, it would aid France to protect its West Indian possessions against British attack.

European Great Powers at war 1778-1784
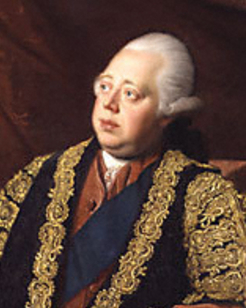
Lord North, British Tory
for Parliament's imperial supremacy and British merchantilism in America

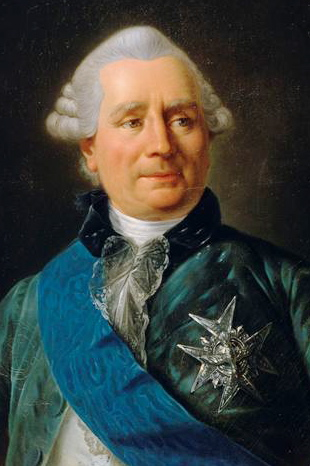
comte de Vergennes
for US independence
& French territorial expansion in America

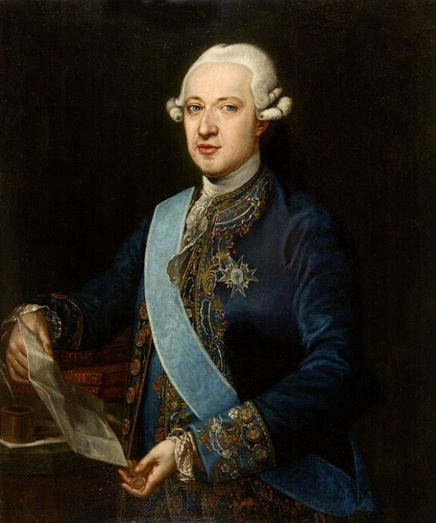
conde de Floridablanca
Spanish war party to regain Gibraltar, Minorca & Floridas from Britain

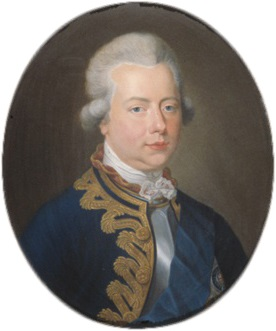
William V
for Dutch-US trade,
& independence from Hanover (George III)

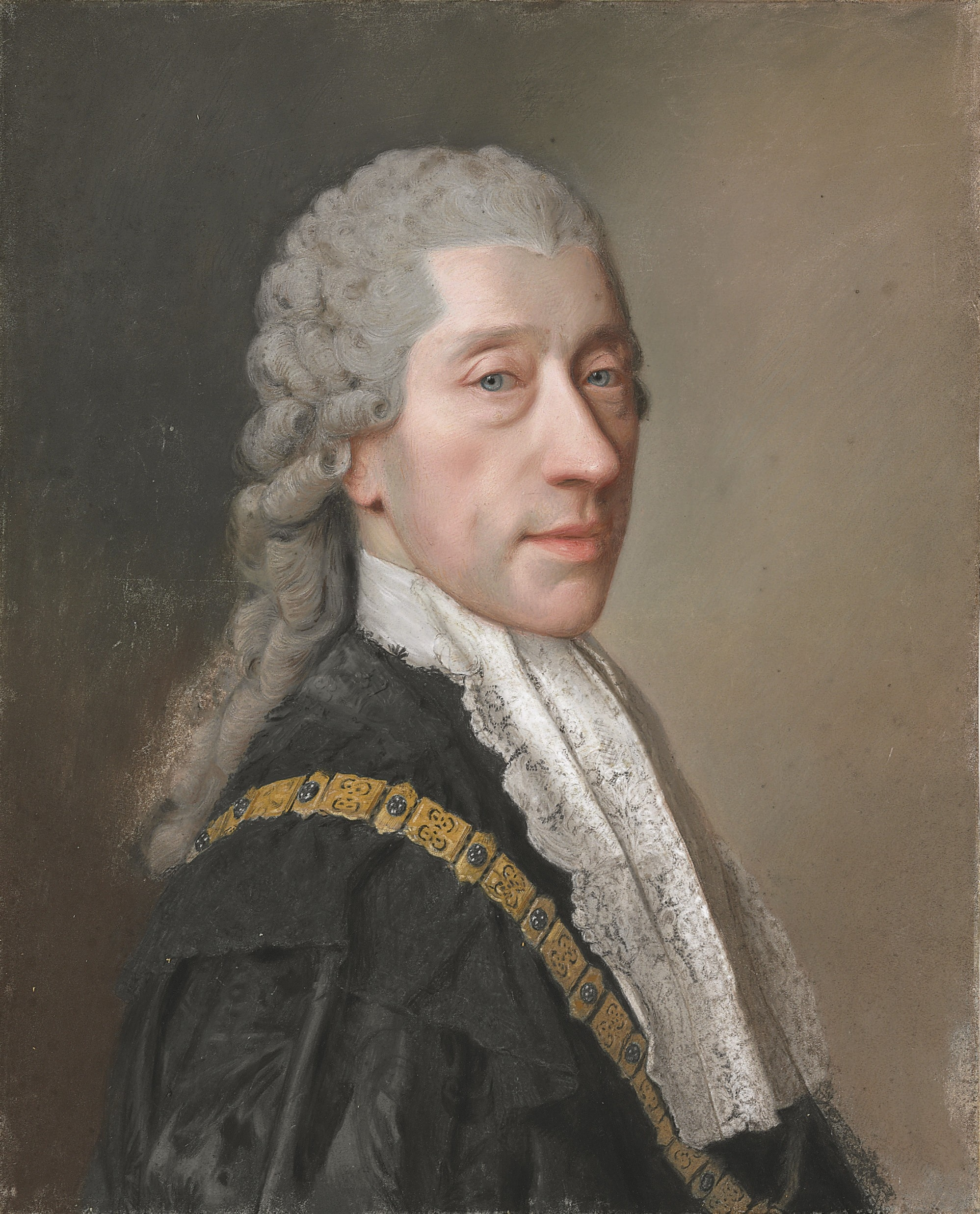
Wenzel Anton
Chancellor of Austria
for partition of US
& Euro balance of power

After the US Congress rejected its Carlisle Commission, Britain responded by taking aggressive action against any nation providing military assistance to the US Congress. It reasoned that violated Parliament's mercantile trade restrictions for its Thirteen Colonies. For Britain, the colonial civil war with Congress that began formally at its 1776 Declaration of Independence, now expanded into a war worldwide, beginning when France declared the Anglo-French War of 1778. By April 1779, Spain joined France to war against Britain in the secret Treaty of Aranjuez. Spain sought to reclaim the portion of its empire that it had lost to Britain at the last peace, including Gibraltar, Minorca, and the Floridas.

At that, France broke its military treaty of alliance with the US. First, the French-US treaty guaranteed US independence; but Spain neither joined their alliance as formally invited in Article X, nor did Spain guarantee US independence in the Franco-Spanish treaty. Second, the French-US treaty pledged France to war with Britain until US independence in Article XII; but its treaty with Spain pledged France to war with Britain until Spain gained Gibraltar, regardless of whether Britain agreed to US independence beforehand. And the terms of this secret Aranjuez treaty to gain Gibraltar were made without the knowledge or consent of the US as a party to the Franco-Spanish alliance against Britain. That directly violated Article IV of the French-US treaty. Third, in the French-US treaty Article VI, the French renounced all territory belonging to Great Britain. That provided for Britain to cede fishing rights to the US at Newfoundland, which it did at Anglo-US conclusive peace; but the Franco-Spanish treaty stipulates that they will conquer Newfoundland from the British and then share it only between themselves.

In 1780, to deter further aggression by Great Britain at sea, neutral Continental powers with continuing trade among Britain's thirteen rebelling colonies formed the First League of Armed Neutrality, including Austria, Russia, and Prussia. These insisted that the Anglo-Russian Treaty of 1766 provided for free trade among British dominions, only excepting military contraband or in view of a belligerent's stationary blockade on a port.

These additional conflicts around the globe with France and Spain strained Britain's resources for the war in America. The French blockaded Barbados and Jamaica, to damage British trade. The British defeated a French naval force on December 15 and captured St. Lucia. But in 1779, the French began capturing British territories, seizing St. Vincent and Grenada. Britain lost the Battle of Grenada badly in 1779. France and Spain failed to invade England, but a Franco-Spanish fleet decisively defeated a large British convoy bound for the West Indies off the Azores. The defeat was catastrophic for Britain. Spain failed to capture the British naval station at Gibraltar, but the British blockade of Spain and France proved ineffective.

Britain would choose to abandon imperial rule of its Thirteen Colonies, but instead rely on the British-US common history, family kinship, and trade. It would break any future US dependence on a military alliance with France by providing for a territory large enough to grow into a military power on the American continent. After giving up on the American colonies, the redirected treasury, growing navy, and enthusiastic home recruitment to take revenge on the French all combined to lead the British navy to victories around the world 1782–1784. Britain was able to dictate the terms and sequence in four separate bi-lateral peace treaties with the Americans, France, Spain, and the Dutch Republic.

=== Britain's response to the deal ===
The terms of the peace, particularly the proposed treaty with the United States, caused a political storm in Britain. The concession of the Northwest Territory and the Newfoundland fisheries, and especially the apparent abandonment of Loyalists by an Article which the individual States would inevitably ignore, were condemned in Parliament. The last point was the easiest solved—-British tax revenue saved by not continuing the war would be used to compensate Loyalists and many received free land in Nova Scotia. Nevertheless, on 17 February 1783 and again on 21 February, motions against the treaty were successful in Parliament, so on 24 February Lord Shelburne resigned, and for five weeks the British government was without a leader. Finally, a solution similar to the previous year's choice of Lord Rockingham was found. The government was to be led, nominally, by the Duke of Portland, while the two Secretaries of State were to be Charles Fox and, remarkably, Lord North. Richard Oswald was replaced by a new negotiator, David Hartley, but the Americans refused to allow any modifications to the treaty— partly because they would have to be approved by Congress, which with two Atlantic crossings, would take several months. Therefore, on 3 September 1783, at Hartley's hotel in Paris, the treaty as agreed to, by Richard Oswald the previous November, was formally signed, and at Versailles, the separate treaties with France and Spain were also formalised.

== Treaty of Paris ==
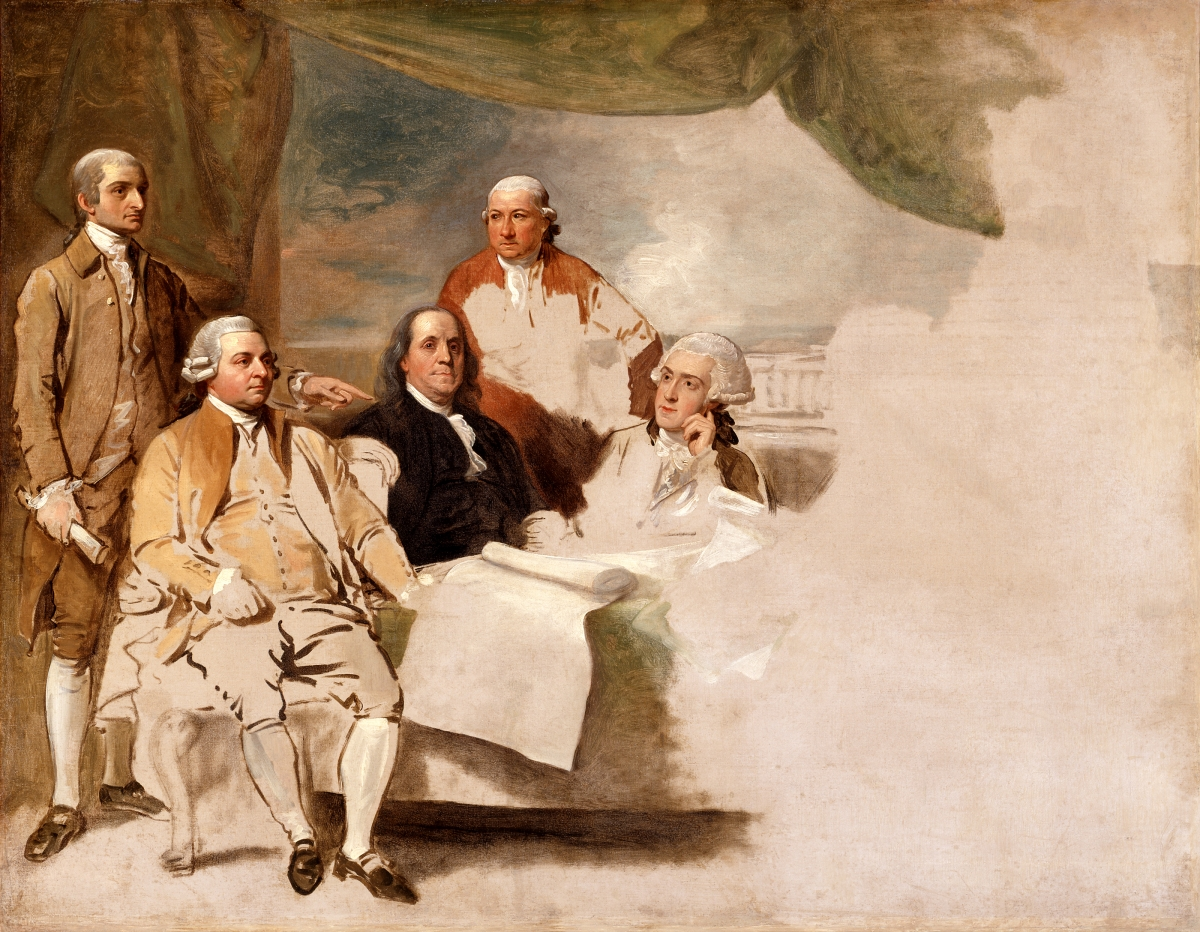
Treaty of Paris by Benjamin West portrays the Americans about to sign the 1783 Treaty of Paris: J. Jay, J. Adams, B. Franklin, W.T. Franklin, and H. Laurens. The British delegation refused to pose, not wishing to memorialize the British defeat, and the painting was never completed.

The Treaty of Paris, signed on September 3, 1783, ratified by the Congress of the Confederation on January 14, 1784, and by the King of Great Britain on April 9, 1784 (the ratification documents were exchanged in Paris on May 12, 1784), formally ended the American Revolutionary War between Great Britain and the United States of America, which had rebelled against British rule starting in 1775.

The other combatant nations at war with Britain at the time were France in the Anglo-French War (1778), Spain with France by the Treaty of Aranjuez (1779), and the Dutch Republic in the Fourth Anglo-Dutch War. All three had other separate peace agreements with Britain for their respective imperial swaps of territories scattered worldwide; for details of these see Peace of Paris (1783).

=== Preliminary agreements ===
From 1782 to 1784 there were many diplomats in and out of Paris who were directly involved with international peace negotiations. They deliberated over three wars among four principle belligerents: first, the American Revolutionary War among Britain, the US and their French allies; second, the Anglo-French War (1778) among Britain, the French and their Spanish allies; and third, the Fourth Anglo-Dutch War (1780) between Britain and the Netherlands. In addition, the diplomats of Great Power nations among the First League of Armed Neutrality consulted one another and exchanged various proposals from their respective governments, especially those of Russia and Austria that Britain had invited to be mediators among the Great Powers.

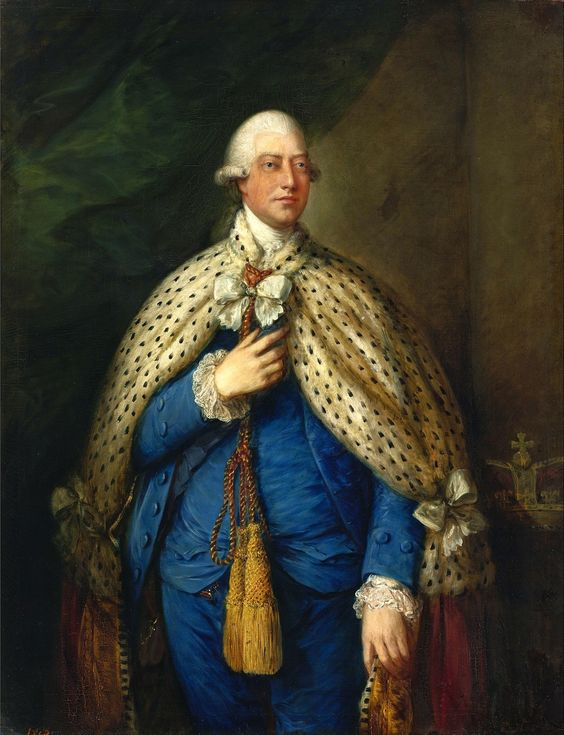
King George III, 1785 in his parliamentary robes

The British-Thirteen Colony conflict had lasted over six years from 1775 Lexington to 1781 Yorktown. About three years into the conflict, France and the US struck an agreement at the Treaty of Alliance (1778) that promised those two would consult before concluding peace with Britain for US independence. Then the next year, France and Spain consorted in secret at the Treaty of Aranjuez (1779) to promise those two would fight until Spain gained Gibraltar, at the choke-point passage between the Mediterranean and the Atlantic. After the Yorktown defeat and Parliament's resolution to end American fighting, British Prime Minister Shelburne sought to separate the US from warring France by strengthening the American peace settlement so that in the future, the US would not depend militarily on France. He also sought to strengthen Britain with continued to trade with the future US. French Foreign Minister Vergennes sought to influence the "American Settlement" for the long term interests of France. He wanted to weaken the US militarily to ensure its future dependence on France in a perpetual military alliance against Britain. (Note: For Britain's part, previous Parliamentary resolutions to end offensive action in North America were adopted and extended on December 5, 1782. In a Speech from the Throne to the joint session of Parliament, George III offered the US Congress independence, peaceful trade, and ultimately to forge "a bond of permanent union between the two countries" based on religion, language, interest and affection.)

In Paris, the three Great Power belligerents in the Anglo-French War floated distinctly different proposals for a mutual "American Settlement" apportioning territory for the United States. The first map shown is the French, the most restrictive of the US, with a western boundary at the Appalachian Mountains to match the British 1763 Proclamation Line, an item used to indict George III in the US Declaration of Independence. The second, Spanish map allows for additional Mississippi River Basin upland just west of the Appalachians for the US. But it also requires that the British cede its colony of Georgia to Spain in violation of the Franco-American alliance of 1778, and contrary to the British announcement for US independence by George III in December 1782. The third, British map was accepted by Congress in April 1783, with US territory west to the middle of the Mississippi River as a preliminary agreement. Congress had interpreted its national interest to be found in the peace treaty that ceded the most expansive territory considered by the European Great Powers. It trusted British treaty guarantees with bonds of history, family and trade over remonstrances from the ministers of France and Spain who were motivated by a secret treaty that the US had not agreed to. (Note: Britain and the US signed a final treaty on September 13, 1783, but not until after preliminary agreements with France and Spain were signed. Then the British and US signed their “conclusive” Treaty of Paris (1783) in the morning to establish US territory in America, and the American ministers all took a coach ride out to the Louis XVI palace at Versailles to see the signing of the conclusive Anglo-French Treaty of Versailles (1783) for British-French territorial settlement worldwide, and then the conclusive Anglo-Spanish Treaty of Versailles (1783) for the British-Spanish territorial settlement worldwide.)

Maps proposed for US territory by France (1782), Spain (1782), Great Britain (1783)

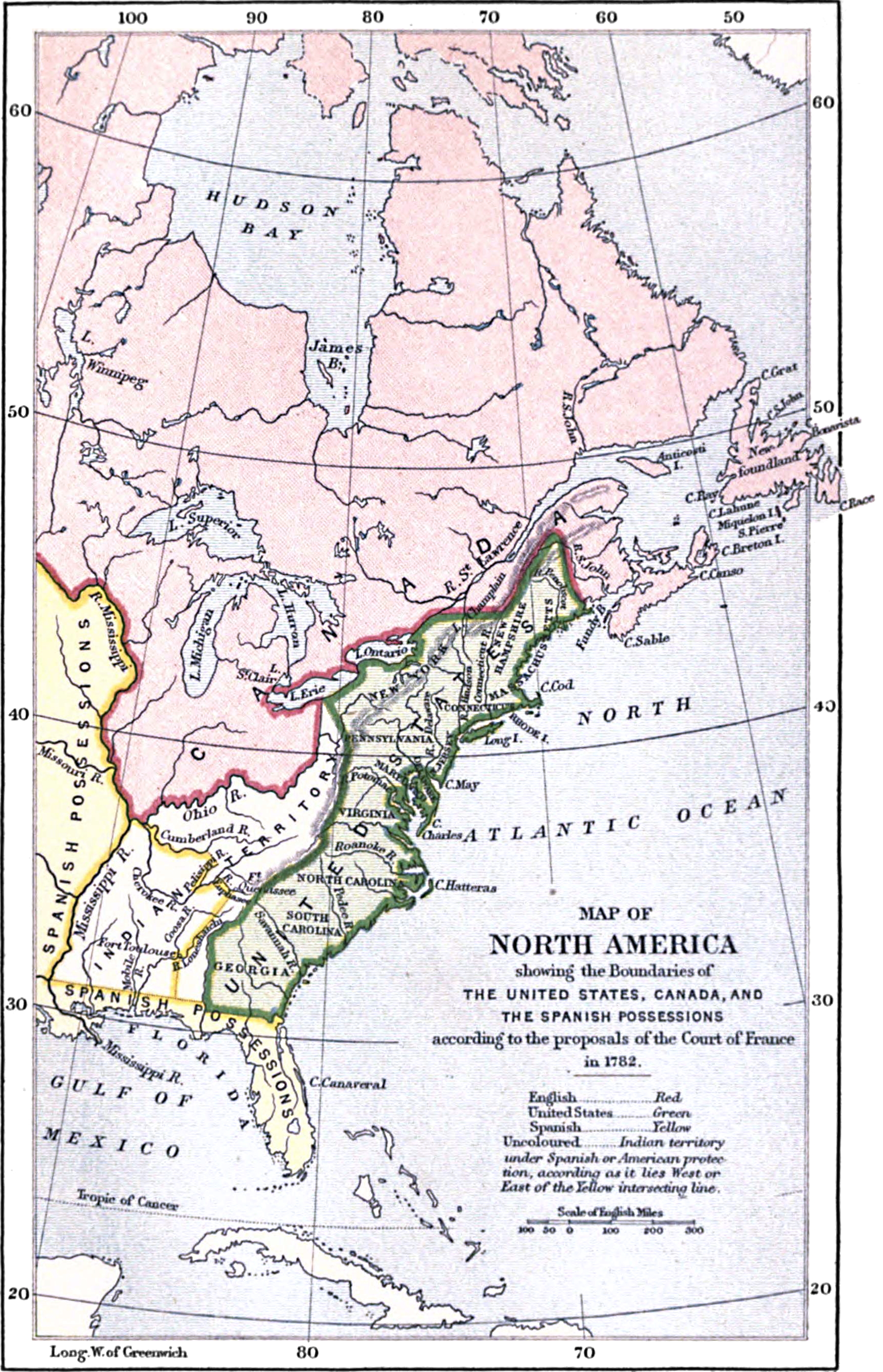
French: readopt Royal Proclamation of 1763 (Note: The French proposed the King George III 1763 Proclamation Line which arbitrarily cut off the Stuart King colonial charter land grants of the 1600s. At the time it inflamed American colonists and took away their good feeling for British Empire victory over the French in the Seven Years' War (French and Indian War). The US western boundary from the southern shore midpoint of Lake Erie, southeast to the Appalachian Mountains, south along the Eastern Continental Divide to Georgia, then south to Spain's East Florida.)

Spanish: Britain is meant to cede Georgia to Spain;
US gains easternmost sliver of western Quebec. (Note: The US western boundary from southern end of Lake Erie, south to the confluence of the Grand Kanawa and Ohio Rivers (mid-modern West Virginia), southerly to the South Carolina boundary at the Appalachian Mountains; but Savannah and Georgia ceded by Britain to Spain.)

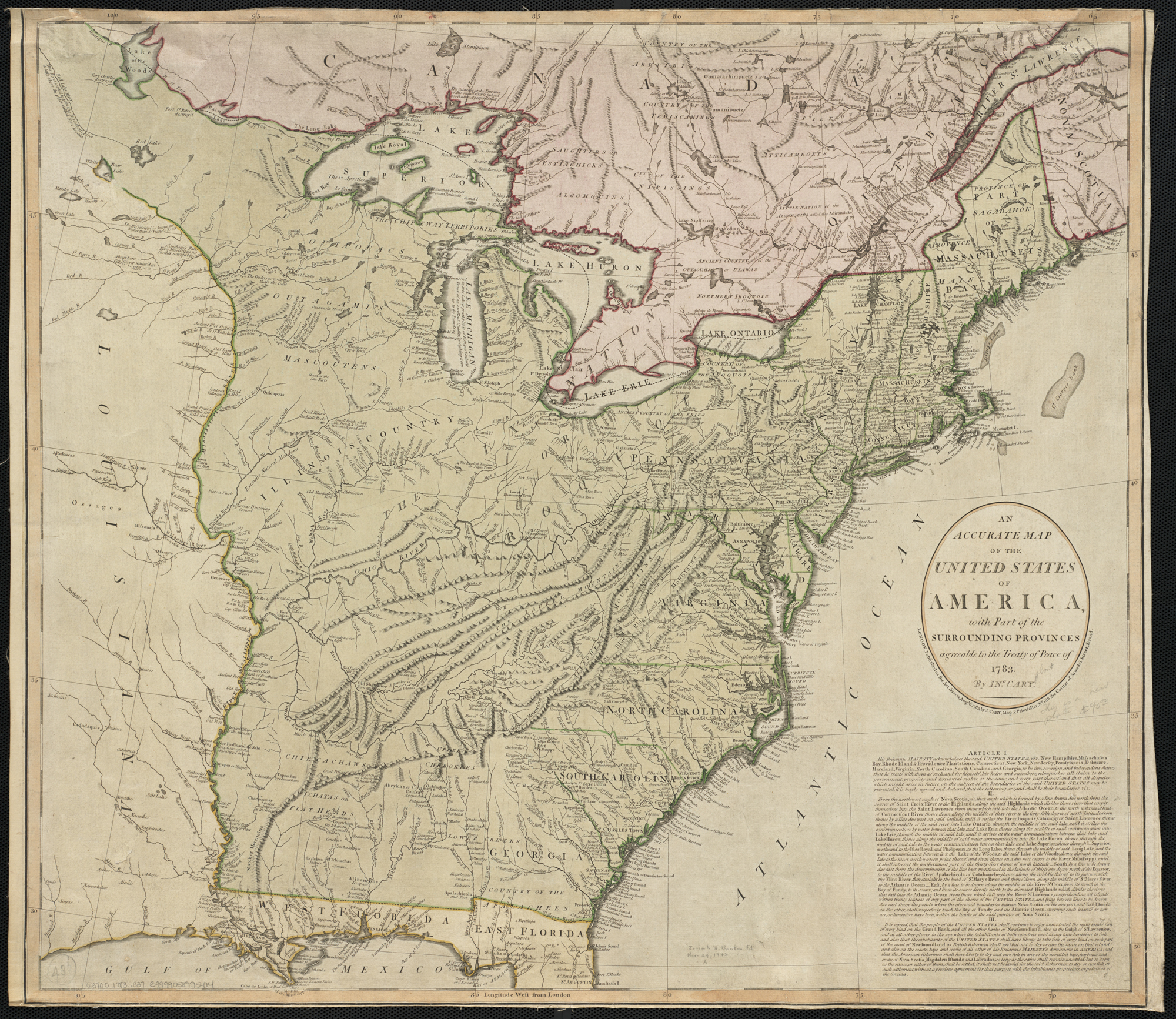
British and US: "Conclusive" Treaty of Paris,
US west to Mississippi River midpoint (Note: US boundaries defined in the Treaty of Paris (1783) between Great Britain and the United States alone, Article 2. (a) west: "… from the northwest angle of Nova Scotia … through the middle of … [Lake Ontario, Lake Erie, Lake Huron, Lake Superior … Long Lake, Lake of the Woods], … "to the northwesternmost point thereof, and from thence on a due west course to the river Mississippi; (b) south: … thence … along the middle of the said river until it shall intersect with the northernmost part of the thirty-first degree of north latitude; (c) east" … to the Atlantic Ocean … comprehending all islands within twenty leagues of any part of the shores of the United States … between … Nova Scotia [on the north] … and East Florida … [on the south]")

=== The agreement ===
Based on preliminary articles made 30 November 1782 in Paris, the George III announcement for American independence in his December 5, 1782 Speech from the Throne, and approval by the Congress of the Confederation on 15 April 1783, this treaty was signed in Paris on 3 September 1783. Subsequently, ratified by Congress on 14 January 1784, that formality, along with British Parliament's ratification a month later, were then exchanged in Paris between the ministers of Britain and the US. Diplomatically, that third exchange of national intent between Britain and the US in Paris finally ended the American War of Independence between Great Britain and its thirteen former colonies which had formed the United States of America on 4 July 1776.

The treaty document was signed at the Hôtel de York, now 56 rue Jacob, by John Adams, Benjamin Franklin, and John Jay (representing the United States) and David Hartley (a member of the British Parliament representing the British monarch, King George III). Hartley was staying at the hotel, which was therefore chosen in preference to the nearby British Embassy – 44 rue Jacob – as "neutral" ground for the signing.

The American Congress of the Confederation ratified the treaty of Paris on January 14, 1784, and copies were sent back to Europe for ratification by the other parties involved, the first reaching France in March. British ratification occurred on April 9, 1784, and the ratified versions were exchanged in Paris on May 12, 1784. It was not for some time, though, that the Americans in the countryside received the news due to the lack of communication.

On September 3, Britain also signed separate agreements with France and Spain, and (provisionally) with the Dutch Republic. In the treaty with Spain, the colonies of East and West Florida were ceded to Spain (without any clearly defined northern boundary, resulting in disputed territory resolved with the Treaty of Madrid), as was the island of Menorca, while the Bahama Islands, Grenada and Montserrat, captured by the French and Spanish, were returned to Britain. The treaty with France was mostly about exchanges of captured territory (France's only net gains were the island of Tobago, and Senegal in Africa), but also reinforced earlier treaties, guaranteeing fishing rights off Newfoundland. Dutch possessions in the East Indies, captured in 1781, were returned by Britain to the Netherlands in exchange for trading privileges in the Dutch East Indies.

=== Full texts (French and English) ===
- Jenkinson, Charles A Collection of All the Treaties of Peace, Alliance, and Commerce Between Great Britain and Other Powers vol. 3, pages 334 onward. London, Debrett (1785), via Google Books— accessed 2008-01-03

=== Treaty enforcement ===
Privileges which the Americans had received from Britain automatically when they had colonial status were withdrawn, (including protection from North African pirates in the Mediterranean that led to the First and the Second Barbary Wars). Individual states ignored Federal recommendations, under Article 5, to restore confiscated Loyalist property, and also evaded Article 6 (e.g. by confiscating Loyalist property for "unpaid debts"). Some, notably Virginia, also defied Article 4, and maintained laws against payment of debts to British creditors. The British also largely ignored Article 7, which called for the return of all runaway slaves who had escaped to British lines.

The real geography of North America turned out not to match the details, given in the Canadian boundary descriptions. The Treaty specified a southern boundary for the United States, but the separate Anglo-Spanish agreement did not specify a northern boundary for Florida, and the Spanish government assumed that the boundary was the same as in 1764, when Britain had enlarged the territory of West Florida. While that dispute continued, Spain used its new control of Florida to block American access to the Mississippi, in defiance of Article 8.

In the Great Lakes area, the British adopted a very generous interpretation of the stipulation that they should relinquish control "with all convenient speed", because they needed time to negotiate with the Native Americans, who had kept the area out of United States control, but had been completely ignored in the Treaty. Even after that was accomplished, Britain retained control as a bargaining counter in hopes of obtaining some recompense for the confiscated Loyalist property. This matter was finally settled by the Jay Treaty in 1794, and America's ability to bargain on all these points was greatly strengthened by the creation of the new constitution in 1787, and victory at the Battle of Fallen Timbers.

=== Aftermath ===
==== U.S. ministers abroad ====
In 1784, the British allowed trade with the United States but forbade some American food exports to the West Indies, while British exports to America reached £3.7 million, and imports only £750,000. This imbalance caused a shortage of gold in the U.S. In 1784, New York-based merchants opened the China trade, followed by Salem, Boston, Philadelphia. In 1785, John Adams was appointed first minister to the Court of St James's (Great Britain), and Jefferson replaced Franklin as minister to France. In 1789, the Jay–Gardoqui Treaty granted Spain the exclusive right to navigate the Mississippi River for 30 years, but was not ratified because of opposition from Western states. George Washington appointed John Quincy Adams United States Ambassador to the Netherlands in 1794, and to Portugal in 1796. John Adams in 1797 appointed his son John Quincy Adams as Minister to Prussia. There, Adams signed the renewal of the very liberal Prussian-American Treaty of Amity and Commerce after negotiations with Prussian Foreign Minister Count Karl-Wilhelm Finck von Finckenstein.

==== France ====
In 1793, a worldwide war erupted between Great Britain and France, and their respective allies. In April, George Washington issued a proclamation announcing the neutrality of the United States in the conflict among the belligerent nations of Europe.

In 1797, the XYZ Affair erupted, with the humiliation of the United States government by French diplomats, leading to the threat of war with France, and ultimately the Quasi-War, an undeclared naval war from 1798 to 1800.

America remained neutral between Britain and France until the War of 1812, did business with both sides, and was harassed by both sides.

==== Britain ====
In 1795, the United States signed the Jay Treaty with Britain which averted war, and led to a decade of peaceful trade, but failed to settle neutrality issues. The British eventually evacuated the Western forts, with boundary lines and debts (in both directions) settled by arbitration. The treaty was barely approved by the Senate (1795) after revision, and was intensely opposed. It became a major issue in formation of the first party system.

==== Spain ====
The Treaty of Madrid established boundaries between the United States and the Spanish colonies of Florida and Louisiana, and guaranteed navigation rights on the Mississippi River.

==== Tripoli ====
In 1797, the United States signed a peace treaty with the Barbary state of Tripoli. However, this treaty was violated in 1801 by the Basha of Tripoli, which led to the Tripolitanian War.

==== Ragusa ====
Ragusa (present-day Dubrovnik, Croatia), a major city with historical and cultural ties to Italy on the Adriatic Sea, was interested in the economic potential of the United States learned by its diplomatic representative in Paris, Francesco Favi. He was in touch with Ferdinand III, Grand Duke of Tuscany at the request of the scholar Giovanni Fabbroni. The United States was anxious to conclude trade agreements with foreign powers during this period of the revolution. The American diplomat Arthur Lee learned that Italian merchants wanted to trade with the Americans but worried about the risk of corsairs or privateers. Since 1771, hides were delivered from Baltimore, New York City and Philadelphia to Marseille in France by ships from Ragusa. Ragusa entered into a trade agreement with the United States, and the Americans agreed to allow their ships free passage in their ports.

== See also ==
- Diplomacy of John Adams
- History of U.S. foreign policy, 1776–1801
- Diplomacy of the American Civil War
