= 1787 in Pennsylvania =

- Decades: 1760s; 1770s; 1780s; 1790s; 1800s
- See also: History of Pennsylvania; Historical outline of Pennsylvania; List of years in Pennsylvania; 1787 in the United States

The following is a list of events of the year 1787 in Pennsylvania.

== Events ==
- May 25 to September 17: The Constitutional Convention took place in Philadelphia.
- September 17: The Signing of the United States Constitution occurs at Independence Hall in Philadelphia.
- December 12: The Proprietary Province of Pennsylvania officially becomes the State of Pennsylvania.

== See also ==
- 1787 in the United States
