= 1777 in Pennsylvania =

- Decades: 1750s; 1760s; 1770s; 1780s; 1790s
- See also: History of Pennsylvania; Historical outline of Pennsylvania; List of years in Pennsylvania; 1777 in the United States

This is a list of events in the year 1777 in Pennsylvania.

== Incumbents ==
- Governor: Thomas Wharton Jr. (starting 5 March)

== Events ==
- July: The Philadelphia campaign begins.
- September 11: The Battle of Brandywine takes place in Chadds Ford Township.
- September 16: The Battle of the Clouds takes place in East Whiteland Township.
- September 20: The Battle of Paoli takes place in Willistown Township and Malvern.
- September 26 to November 16: The Siege of Fort Mifflin takes place at Fort Mifflin.
- October 4: The Battle of Germantown takes place at Germantown.
- November 15: The writing of the Articles of Confederation was completed,
- December 5: The Battle of White Marsh takes place in Whitemarsh Township.
- December 11: The Battle of Matson's Ford takes place in Battle of Matson's Ford, near present-day Conshohocken.

== See also ==
- 1777 in the United States
- List of years in Pennsylvania
