= Raymond Horsch =

American criminal and artist (1943–2025)

Raymond Charles Horsch
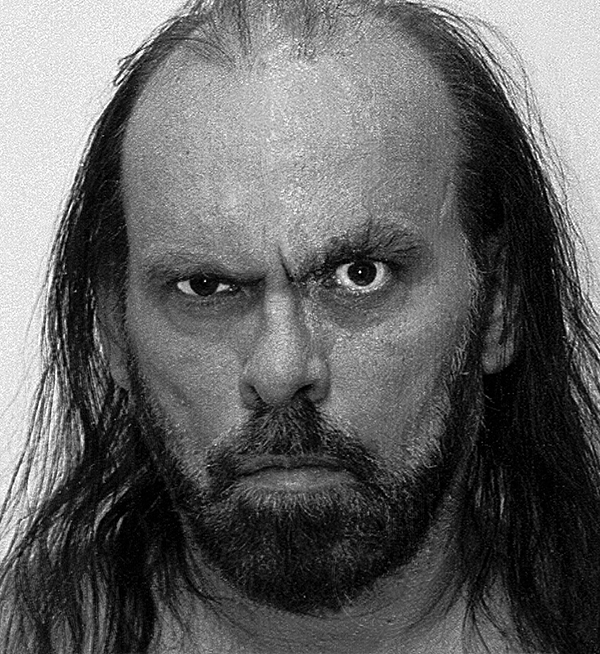
- Horsch, c. 1999
- Born: Raymond Charles Hoersch; May 5, 1943; East Stroudsburg, Pennsylvania, U.S.
- Died: May 2025 (aged 82)
- Occupations: Writer; pornographic film director
- Spouses: Unknown (m. 1964; div. 1970) Myroslawa Anna Ferkuniak (m. 1980; died 1989) Amy McHale (m. 2004; div. 2008)
- Relatives: Eugene Albert Horsch (son)
- Convictions: Counterfeiting; manufacture of methamphetamine; cannabis cultivation

Details
- Victims: 5 suspected murders 2 others missing

Raymond Charles Horsch (Note: also spelled Hoersch or Hörsch) (May 5, 1943 – May 2025) was an American erotic photographer, pornographic filmmaker, convicted criminal and suspected serial killer. Prior to his suspicion of murder, Horsch was known for a fifty-year body of artistic work, often focusing on "scantily clad women in sadomasochistic settings". Critics of his work accused him of exploiting his subjects. Horsch had numerous criminal convictions, including for drug manufacturing and forgery. In June 2016, his ex-wife Amy McHale, to whom he was married between 2004 and 2008, disappeared.

In 2026, Horsch's former Philadelphia residence was searched by police and linked to the disappearance of seven women, five of whom are believed dead. Police say they have recovered videos and images that show two women alive in the house and then deceased. Several women in these videos who had appeared deceased were confirmed missing, and their bodies have never been recovered. Police have stated they believe another video from the house shows Horsch killing a woman.

== Early life and career ==
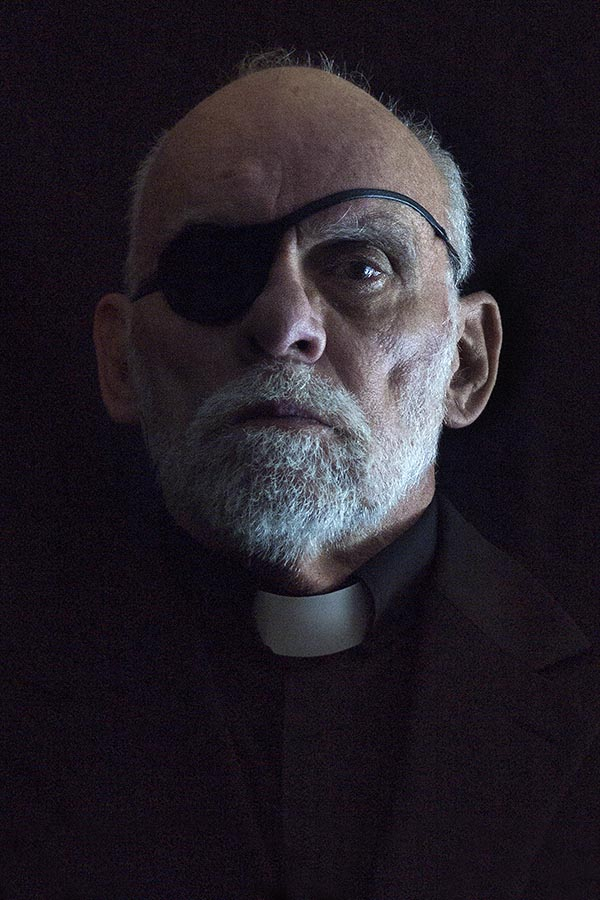
Horsch in character for a film role, c. 2014

Raymond Charles Hoersch was born in East Stroudsburg, Pennsylvania, on May 5, 1943. In a 1985 psychological exam, Horsch was determined to have an IQ of 140. He claimed that he was raised on a farm in Bucks County by a "strict but fair" father and a "salt of the earth" mother, and that during his adolescence, philosophical differences strained his relationship with his parents and caused him to rebel in school. He also claimed to have been expelled from two colleges.

In October 1969, Horsch opened an avant-garde movie theater, the Underground Cinema 16, in a former live theater at 2021 Sansom Street in Philadelphia, as part of a plan to finance a film. Within two weeks, the theater was closed for operating without a license. The theater reopened and later became the Roxy. Horsch later directed films, beginning with The Erotic Memoirs of a Male Chauvinist Pig (1973), continuing to release films until shortly before his death in 2025.

== Legal issues ==
In 1973, Horsch pleaded guilty to passing bad checks in North Carolina. In December 1974 he was arrested in Hatboro, Pennsylvania, for passing counterfeit $10 bills. At the time, he was driving a stolen car with a fraudulent registration and driver's license. The United States Secret Service raided Horsch's home in Chalfont, Pennsylvania, allegedly where the bills were being made, where they arrested an accomplice and seized $180,000 in fake bills along with fake driver's licenses and registrations. Horsch was charged with theft by deception and for making the counterfeit bills. He received a two-year prison sentence.

In 1977, police raided Horsch's home and discovered equipment that they alleged was used in the manufacture of methamphetamine. He fled to the West Coast, where he stole the identity of a chemist named Stanley Eugene Stokowski, then moved to Timaru, New Zealand, in 1980. There, he became a high-profile chemist and helped open an ethanol fuel plant. Horsch often traveled from New Zealand, using the alias "Richard Harris" in California. In 1984, he was caught reentering New Zealand with five fake passports. Horsch then fled back to the United States after allegedly breaking into a house and stealing a passport. He was captured by the FBI in Orlando, Florida, in 1985 and extradited to Philadelphia. He was sentenced to four years' imprisonment and released early in 1987.

In March 2009, Horsch was arrested for attempting to lure a nine-year-old girl into his car in the Kensington neighborhood of Philadelphia. He was charged with corrupting the morals of a minor and two misdemeanor counts of attempting to lure a child into a vehicle. He was found guilty in a 2010 bench trial and sentenced to two and a half to five years in prison. Horsch appealed, and prosecutors dropped the charges after the girl refused to testify in a second trial, vacating the conviction. In 2015, Horsch successfully petitioned to have the case expunged.

In July 2009, Horsch was charged with growing over 450 cannabis plants in his Chalfont home; two shotguns were also confiscated. The house was seized by federal authorities. In January 2011, Horsch pleaded guilty to possession of 100 or more cannabis plants with intent to distribute, possession of a short-barreled shotgun in furtherance of a drug trafficking crime and possession of a firearm by a convicted felon. He was subsequently sentenced to fifty-four months in prison and released in 2013.

=== Cooperation with federal prosecutors ===
After the 2009 arrest for growing cannabis, Horsch pleaded guilty and entered a plea deal with federal prosecutors, offering to provide information about "crimes against minors, including child prostitution, marijuana and cocaine trafficking, and fraud." The minimum sentence of 20 years was reduced down to 54 months of prison and 5 years of parole by U.S. District Judge R. Barclay Surrick. He was released in 2013. The information Horsch provided was deemed "credible and reliable but too old" and ultimately "played little role in any ongoing cases or future prosecutions." The plea deal filings show that the government was aware of both Horsch's vacated 2009 child-luring charges and his reputation as a meth cook, forger and international fugitive.

In 2012, during sentencing proceedings, defense attorney Jerome Brown claimed to District Judge Surrick that then-Philadelphia Mayor John F. Street discouraged police from arresting Horsch due to his supposed work as a filmmaker documenting addiction in Kensingston. In court transcripts Brown said, "In fact, and I don't have it with me, he even had a letter from Mayor Street that said, if you—don't arrest him because he's doing something good here." Street did not respond to requests for comment but his son, State Senator Sharif Street, said it was "out of character." Sgt. Eric Gripp, a Philadelphia Police spokesperson denied such letters were issued to filmmakers. Jill Fertel, a former Philadelphia prosecutor recalled a similar letter mentioned in court by a different defense attorney during Horsch's dropped 2009 child luring case.

== Personal life and death ==
Horsch was married at least three times. In 1964, he married his high school sweetheart, who left him in 1970. In 1980, he married Myroslawa Anna Ferkuniak in Nevada while using Stokowski's identity. They had a son, Eugene. Ferkuniak died in 1989. In 2004, he married Amy McHale. They divorced in 2008, though they stayed close. McHale disappeared in 2016.

According to The Philadelphia Inquirer, Raymond Horsch used the alias S. E. Stokowski to create and make more than 150 revisions to his namesake Wikipedia article between 2014 and 2021.

Horsch died of chronic obstructive pulmonary disease in May 2025, at the age of 82.

== 2026 police investigations ==
In 2026, an ongoing investigation was started by the Philadelphia Police Department (PPD) involving evidence recovered from his former house in the Olney section of Philadelphia after the arrest of his son, Eugene, on drug and weapons charges. A federal grand jury later indicted Eugene on charges of possession of a firearm by a felon and possession of an unlawfully produced document and authentication feature. Pennsylvania prosecutors withdrew five state charges on August 6.

On August 28, The Philadelphia Inquirer reported that police believe video footage recovered from the house shows Horsch killing a woman. The police have not found a body. The video reportedly shows Horsch tightening a zip tie around a woman's neck until she passes out. The woman was identified by a family member as Nicole Fusaro, who has been missing since 2018.

== Anthologies ==
- The Mammoth Book of Erotic Photography, Maxim Jakubowski (editor), Running Press; Fourth Edition (October 1, 2013), ISBN 978-0762449446
- The Mammoth Book of Erotic Women, Maxim Jakubowski (editor), Running Press; 1ST edition (October 19, 2005), ISBN 978-0786716029
- Photo Sex, David Steinberg (editor), Down There Press, San Francisco, 2003, ISBN 978-0940208322
- Sex in the City – An Illustrated History, by Alison Maddox with foreword by Camille Paglia, Rizzoli Universe Publishing (February 14, 2006), ISBN 978-0789315076
- Empathy: The Memoir of an Empathetic Serial Killer (2014). ISBN 9781492890553.
- Annie (2014), with Anna M. Ferkuniak. ISBN 978-1-4929-7105-4.
- Transgressions (2014). ISBN 9781493512454.
- Slaves (2014). ISBN 9781492177180.
