= Peter Gilles =

Peter Gilles is also an Anglicisation of the name of the Flemish humanist Pieter Gillis.

Peter Gilles was born 1776 in France and died 1839 in Philadelphia, Pennsylvania, United States. He emigrated to the United States around 1815 with his father Peter Gilles Sr. and his brother, Henri Noël Gilles. Peter Gilles was a violoncellist and one of the first American Composers He was a founding member of the Musical Fund Society.

== List of works ==
- La bergère d'elaissêe
