= 2024 in Pennsylvania =

- Decades: 2000s; 2010s; 2020s
- See also: History of Pennsylvania; Historical outline of Pennsylvania; List of years in Pennsylvania; 2024 in the United States

The following is a list of events of the year 2024 in Pennsylvania.

== Incumbents ==
=== State government ===
- Governor:Josh Shapiro (D)

== Events ==
- February 7 – 2024 East Lansdowne shooting: A man commits a familicide in Pennsylvania in which he kills his family of five before shooting at police injuring two officers before committing suicide. The shooter was identified as 43-year-old Canh Le.
- March 16 – Three people are fatally shot in Levittown with the gunman fleeing to Trenton, New Jersey by commandeering a car to his house. A standoff involving several hostages ends with the gunman's arrest.
- May 10 –
  - A Pennsylvania jury orders ExxonMobil to pay $725.5 million to a former mechanic who claimed that the company's gasoline and solvents caused him to develop leukemia.
  - Police dismantle encampments and arrest dozens of students protesting at the University of Pennsylvania in Philadelphia.
  - One person was killed and six others injured in Philadelphia.
- July 13 – Attempted assassination of Donald Trump: Former U.S. president and current presidential candidate Donald Trump is injured in an assassination attempt at a campaign rally in Butler County, with his condition later reported as "fine" by a spokesperson. The suspect was shot dead after two audience members were critically injured and one killed in the shooting.
- September 10 – A presidential debate hosted by ABC News between U.S. vice president and Democratic nominee Kamala Harris and former president and Republican nominee Donald Trump takes place at the National Constitution Center in Philadelphia.
- September 25 – Republican Speaker of the House Mike Johnson demands that Ukrainian president Volodymyr Zelenskyy dismiss Ukrainian ambassador to the United States Oksana Markarova after Zelenskyy visited an ammunition factory in Pennsylvania with several Democratic politicians, which Johnson claims represented foreign electoral intervention.
- November 5 – 2024 United States presidential election in Pennsylvania
- December 9 – Luigi Mangione is arrested at a McDonald's restaurant in Altoona for his alleged involvement in the fatal shooting of UnitedHealthcare CEO Brian Thompson outside a hotel in Midtown Manhattan on December 4.

== See also ==
- 2024 in the United States
- List of years in Pennsylvania
