= 2025 in Pennsylvania =

- Decades: 2000s; 2010s; 2020s
- See also: History of Pennsylvania; Historical outline of Pennsylvania; List of years in Pennsylvania; 2025 in the United States

The following is a list of events of the year 2025 in Pennsylvania.

== Incumbents ==
=== State government ===
- Governor: Josh Shapiro (D)

== Events ==
=== January ===
- January 7 – State Representative Joanna McClinton becomes Speaker of the Pennsylvania House of Representatives.
- January 31 – Med Jets Flight 056, a Learjet 55 operated by Jet Rescue Air Ambulance, crashes shortly after takeoff from Northeast Philadelphia Airport, resulting in the deaths of all six individuals on board and two people on the ground.

=== February ===
- February 22 – UPMC Memorial Hospital shooting: A gunman takes several hostages at a University of Pittsburgh Medical Center hospital near York. Following a shoot-out, the gunman is killed by police. A responding police officer is also killed by friendly fire. Six people are injured, five by gunfire.

=== March ===
- March 2 – 2025 Southwest United States measles outbreak: The first case of measles in Pennsylvania in 2025 is reported in Montgomery County.
- March 31 – Rosemont College announces it will merge into Villanova University.

=== April ===
- April 3 – The PATCO Franklin Square station reopens in Philadelphia after being closed for 45 years.
- April 13 – Pennsylvania Governor's Residence fire: A man sets fire to part of the Pennsylvania Governor's Residence in Harrisburg while Governor Josh Shapiro and his family are inside. The family escapes without injury.

=== May ===
- May 22 – Philadelphia Police Officer Mark Dial is convicted of manslaughter for killing Eddie Irizarry in 2023. In July he is sentenced to time served and released on parole.
- May 30 – Triangle Tech's final class graduates, marking the school's closure.

=== July ===
- July 1
  - 2025 District Council 33 strike: Around 10,000 Philadelphia city workers go on strike, including sanitation workers, pool employees, and 911 dispatchers.
  - The University of Pennsylvania strips all records from transgender swimmer Lia Thomas as part of an agreement with the Trump administration. The next day, the administration releases $175 million in frozen federal funding to the university.
- July 7 – Three people are killed and ten injured in a shooting in South Philadelphia.

=== August ===
- August 5 – Chaofeng Ge dies by hanging in ICE custody at the Moshannon Valley Processing Center in Centre County. The death is declared a suicide.
- August 11 – Two people are killed and ten are injured after an explosion at a US Steel plant in Clairton.
- August 12 – Legionella bacteria are detected at buildings in Berks County.
- August 13–August 24 – 2025 Little League World Series in South Williamsport
- August 24–September 2 — Due to a lack of funding, SEPTA cuts back transit and raises fares. Bus service is cut starting August 24, fares are raised on September 1, and train service is cut on August 2.

=== September ===
- September 17 – Five police officers are shot, three fatally, during a domestic situation in North Codorus Township. The gunman commits suicide.
- September 18 – Pennsylvania and nine other Northeastern states announce the formation of the Northeast Public Health Collaborative, a coalition of local health leaders.
- September 28 – Four people are killed and six are injured in a Lebanon house fire.

=== October ===
- October 25 – One person is killed and six injured in a shooting at Lincoln University during homecoming festivities.

=== November ===
- November 5
  - 2025 Allentown mayoral election: Incumbent Mayor Matt Tuerk wins reelection, beating Republican challenger Ed Zucal, who had run as a Democrat but became the Republican candidate through a write-in campaign.
  - 2025 Pittsburgh mayoral election: Allegheny County Controller Corey O'Connor wins election to become mayor of Pittsburgh.
- November 12 – The Philadelphia Mint produces the last penny in circulation.
- November 22 – Pittsburgh Riverhounds SC wins the 2025 USL Championship playoffs, beating FC Tulsa 5–3 in a penalty shoot-out.

=== December ===
- December 23 – An explosion at a nursing home in Bristol kills an employee and a resident and injures 20.

== See also ==
- 2025 in the United States
- List of years in Pennsylvania
