= 2026 Olney house investigation =

Ongoing police investigation in Philadelphia, Pennsylvania

The 2026 Olney house investigation is an ongoing investigation by the Philadelphia Police Department involving evidence recovered from a house in the Olney section of Philadelphia, Pennsylvania. The investigation began after the June 19, 2026, arrest of the property's owner, Eugene Albert Horsch, on gun and drug charges. A federal grand jury later indicted Horsch on charges of possession of a firearm by a felon and possession of an unlawfully produced document and authentication feature. Pennsylvania prosecutors withdrew five state charges on August 6.

The missing-person investigation has focused on Raymond Horsch, Eugene Horsch's father and the house's former owner, who died in 2025. By September 2026, police had linked seven women to the investigation, including five who appeared deceased in recovered photographs and videos. Police said on September 17 that the medical examiner could not conclusively determine a cause or manner of death without remains to examine. Investigators concluded their search of the property on October 23 without recovering human remains linked to the women. As of November 3, no charges had been filed in connection with the women's disappearances.

== Initial arrest and searches ==
On June 19, 2026, a U.S. park ranger approached a BMW that was parked in a restricted area near Independence National Historical Park. According to a police report, a passenger told the ranger that Horsch, the driver, was going to hurt her. Officers reported finding two loaded firearms, a switchblade, drug material and paraphernalia, other weapons and credentials purporting to identify Horsch as a Drug Enforcement Administration agent.

The passenger presented identification bearing her photograph and the name of Blair Tonzelli, a woman reported missing in 2023. Information obtained after the stop led authorities to search Horsch's property in Olney. At the first public briefing, Deputy Police Commissioner Frank Vanore said he had no evidence that Tonzelli had been inside the house.

Police reported finding an additional firearm and gun parts, ammunition, a marijuana-growing operation, purported federal credentials, five urns believed to contain cremated remains, a 55-gallon drum connected to water lines, more than 20 containers of unknown substances and more than 50 hard drives and other electronic devices at the property. The containers were sent to a laboratory in Chicago for analysis. The Federal Bureau of Investigation assisted with evidence recovery and analysis. Investigators removed a section of sewer line from the property in July. Law enforcement sources said an additional search warrant associated with the excavation sought evidence of "wet cremation", described as using chemicals to break down human remains. No human remains were located during that search. By August 12, police said that more than 95 search warrants had been served in connection with the property and its contents. Earlier forensic testing found that material initially believed to be blood was not blood, and none of the items tested at that stage yielded DNA belonging to Tonzelli or Amy McHale.

At a September 16 briefing, police said three of the five urns were believed to contain the ashes of Eugene Horsch's father, Raymond Horsch, Raymond's sister and a friend.

On September 28, police and FBI agents began another search of the property, preparing to remove floorboards and sections of walls. On October 13, CBS News Philadelphia reported, citing police sources, that human DNA had been found and would undergo further testing.

Investigators recovered bones from the backyard on October 15. Testing determined that they were animal bones. CBS News Philadelphia reported, that a safe hidden in a wall held documents. Philadelphia police and the FBI concluded the search of the property on October 23 without recovering human remains linked to the women. Investigators then returned to reviewing the digital evidence. At the time, testing was pending to determine whether DNA recovered from the house matched any of the women.

== Missing-person investigations ==
The false identification prompted investigators to examine Tonzelli's disappearance. Reporting also connected the property to Amy McHale, the former wife of Horsch's late father Raymond Horsch, who was last known to have been at the property in 2016. It was reported that Eugene Horsch was incarcerated when McHale disappeared. A transcript unsealed on November 3 showed that McHale had testified on Raymond Horsch's behalf at his 2012 federal sentencing for drug and firearms offenses.

On August 12, Police Inspector Raymond Evers said investigators had found videos and photographs on the first hard drive examined that appeared to show Maribel Fresses and Gabrielle Amarando alive inside the house and later apparently deceased. Fresses had been reported missing in 2018 and Amarando in 2012. Evers said the Philadelphia Medical Examiner's Office could not formally determine a cause or manner of death because no remains had been recovered. Police said the recovered digital material included more than 600,000 images, 70,000 videos and 10,000 pages of writings and drawings. Investigators had reviewed approximately 5% to 7% of that material.

As of August 13, police said the digital evidence reviewed up to that point had not linked Tonzelli or McHale to the scene. Evers said investigators had located and interviewed some people depicted in the recovered recordings, while other people shown remained missing.

In August, police declined to say whether they believed Eugene Horsch or his father was involved in the women's presumed deaths. As of August 13, Horsch had not been charged in connection with any of the missing women or any death investigation.

On August 28, The Philadelphia Inquirer reported that police believed video footage found in the house showed Raymond Horsch killing a woman. Police had not recovered her body. On September 11, the newspaper identified the woman as Nicole Fusaro, who had been missing since July 2018, citing family members and law enforcement sources.

On September 16, police announced that photographs showed two additional women who appeared deceased. One had been identified but was not publicly named at her family's request; she had not been reported missing. The other remained unidentified. Their discovery brought the number of women linked to the investigation to seven, including five believed dead. The medical examiner's assessment of the images remained conditional on their authenticity and whether they had been altered. By that date, investigators had identified 58 people in more than one million items of digital evidence and reviewed approximately 30% of the material. Deputy Commissioner Frank Vanore said investigators were working to distinguish staged scenes from evidence of actual violence.

On October 2, CBS News Philadelphia reported, citing law-enforcement sources, that investigators considered Raymond Horsch a suspected serial killer. On November 11, The Philadelphia Inquirer reported that the woman whose name police had withheld in September was Lelia Mae Wright. The newspaper cited Wright's uncle and a police source.

== Legal proceedings ==
In July, a federal grand jury indicted Horsch on one count of possession of a firearm by a felon and one count of possession of an unlawfully produced document and authentication feature. State prosecutors withdrew all five Pennsylvania charges at an August 6 preliminary hearing. In September 2026, the federal trial was rescheduled for March 22, 2027. As of November 11, Horsch remained in federal custody.
