= First League of Armed Neutrality =

European Naval Alliance (1780-1783)

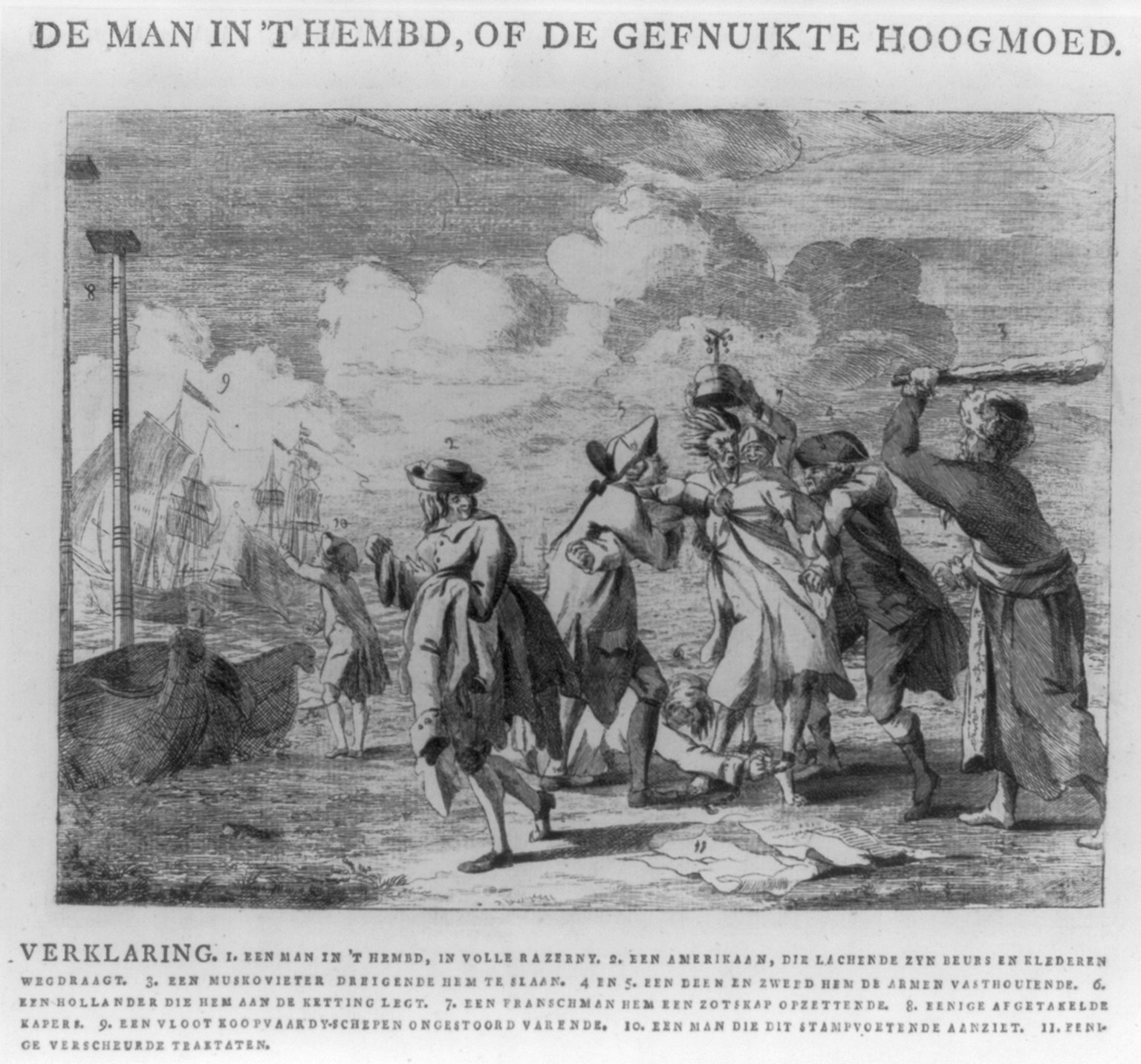
A Dutch cartoon depicting a man in a nightshirt (representing Britain) being attacked by several men (representing the First League of Armed Neutrality and the Franco-Spanish alliance). He is held by a Swede and a Dane, a Frenchman places a fools cap on his head, a Dutchman places shackles around his ankles, an American runs away with his clothes, and a Russian is about to hit him with a club; in the background, a merchant fleet sails out to sea.

The First League of Armed Neutrality was an alliance of European naval powers between 1780 and 1783 which was intended to resist British attempts to inspect neutral shipping for French contraband during the American Revolutionary War. The league was founded by the Russian Empire, Denmark-Norway and Sweden in August 1780. In 1781, Prussia, Austria and Portugal joined the league; in 1782 the Ottoman Empire joined, followed in 1783 by the Kingdom of Naples. Despite the Royal Navy outnumbering all their fleets combined, the British did not wish to antagonise Russia and avoided interfering with the league's merchant shipping. The league was dissolved in 1783 when the end of the Revolutionary War rendered its existence moot.

== Background ==
On 11 March [O.S. 28 February] 1780, Catherine II of Russia issued a declaration that the Russian Empire would adopt a policy of armed neutrality during the ongoing American Revolutionary War. The declaration affirmed the right of neutral countries to trade by sea with the subjects of belligerent countries without interference except if they were trading in weapons and military supplies. It also stated that Russia would not recognize blockades of whole coasts but only of individual ports and only if a belligerent warships were actually present or nearby. The Imperial Russian Navy dispatched three squadrons to the Mediterranean Sea, Atlantic Ocean and North Sea to enforce the decree.

== Existence ==
Denmark-Norway and Sweden accepting Russia's proposals for an alliance of neutrals, adopted the same policy towards shipping, and the three countries signed bilateral agreements and then a tripartite convention forming the League in August 1780. The intention was to band their ships together in convoys and declare their cargoes not to be contraband, although such a declaration would not be accepted by the British. Spain, at war with Britain, pledged to respect the league's neutrality. The Dutch Republic planned to join the League in January 1781, but Britain found out before the treaty could be signed and declared war after it had captured a ship bearing the American diplomat Henry Laurens on his way to Amsterdam to negotiate a loan for the Continental Congress, thus rendering Dutch plans to join the league moot.

The league members remained otherwise out of the war but threatened joint retaliation for every ship of theirs searched by a belligerent. In 1781, Prussia, Austria and Portugal joined the league; in 1782 the Ottoman Empire joined, followed in 1783 by the Kingdom of Naples. As the Royal Navy outnumbered all their fleets combined, the alliance as a military measure was what Catherine later called it, an "armed nullity". Diplomatically, however, it carried greater weight; France and the United States were quick to proclaim their adherence to the new principle of free neutral commerce. As the British did not wish to antagonise Russia, they avoided interfering with the league's shipping. While both sides of the Fourth Anglo-Dutch War tacitly understood it as an attempt to keep the Dutch out of the league, Britain did not officially regard the alliance as hostile. Throughout the war, most of the naval stores of the Royal Navy continued to come from the Baltic Sea.

== End ==
The league ceased to have any practical function after the Treaty of Paris ended the war. It was followed in the Napoleonic Wars by the Second League of Armed Neutrality, which was far less successful and ended after the British victory at the Battle of Copenhagen.

== See also ==
- Diplomacy in the American Revolutionary War
- Blockade of Germany (1914–1919)
