= Second League of Armed Neutrality =

1800 Alliance during the War of the Second Coalition

League of the North
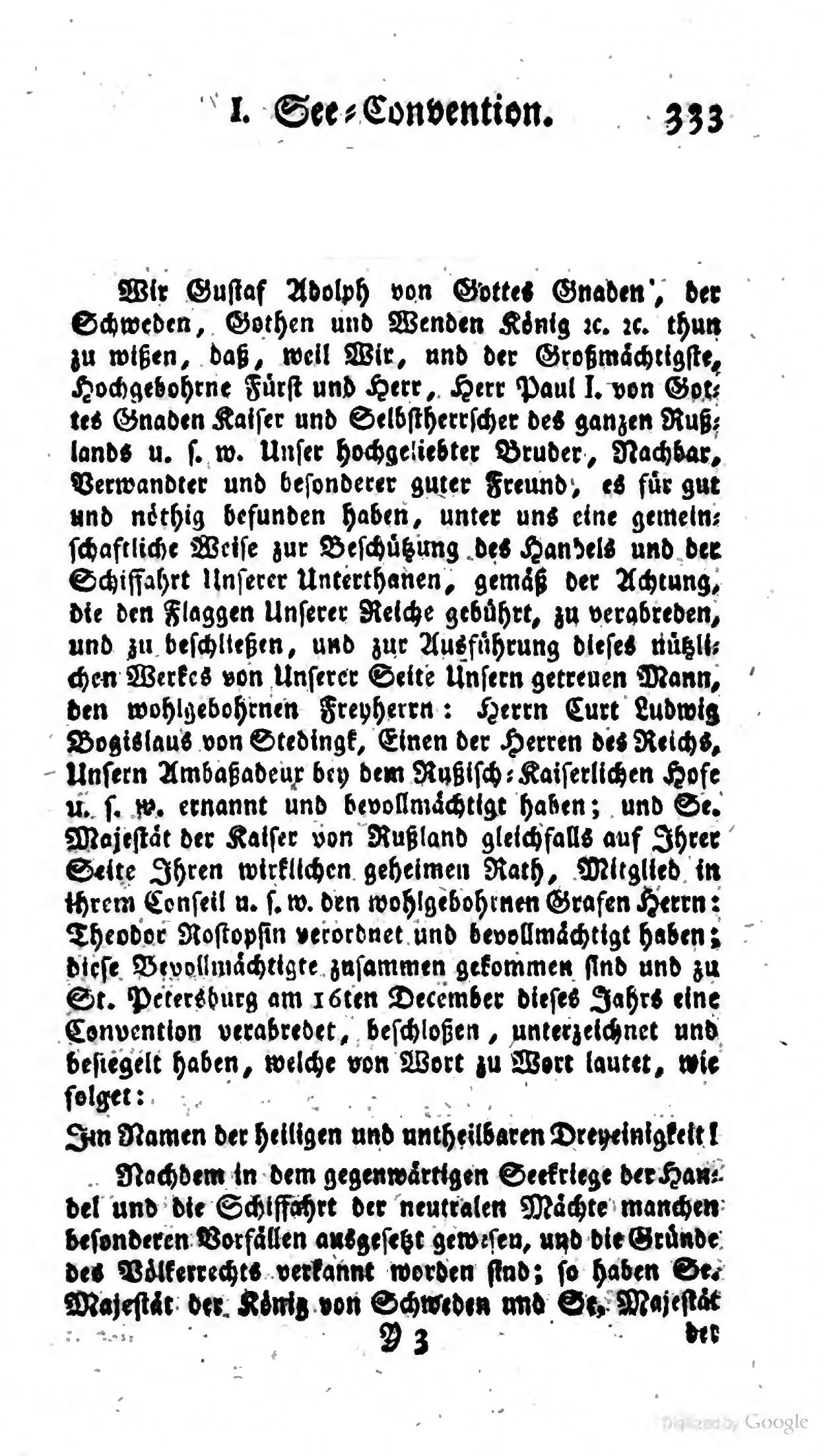
- Second League of Armed Neutrality 1800
- Type: Alliance
- Context: War of the Second Coalition

The Second League of Armed Neutrality or the League of the North was an alliance of the north European naval powers Denmark–Norway, Prussia, Sweden, and Russia. It was founded during the War of the Second Coalition by Paul I of Russia in 1801. A revival of the First League of Armed Neutrality, like the first league it was intended to prevent neutral shipping from being inspected for French contraband by the Royal Navy. The league collapsed in 1801 after Paul was assassinated.

== Background ==
The Second League was intended to counter the Royal Navy's wartime policy of unlimited search of neutral shipping for French contraband, which had been adopted in an attempt to cut off military supplies and other trade to the French First Republic. As the league made no mention of French interference with neutral shipping, the British considered it a pro-French alliance, and sent a fleet into the Baltic under Hyde Parker and Horatio Nelson, along with occupying the Danish West Indies between March 1801 and April 1802. Nelson led an attack on the Danish navy in Battle of Copenhagen, defeating the Danes.

== Collapse ==
In retaliation for the attack on Copenhagen, Prussia invaded Hanover in April 1801. Paul's assassination in March 1801 and the accession of Alexander I as Tsar of Russia led to a change of policy and the alliance collapsed. Anglo-Danish negotiations after the Battle of Copenhagen were quickly resolved once the Danes received news of Paul's assassination. Russia would later join the British in a coalition against Napoleonic France.

== Legacy ==
The prospect of a third league of armed neutrality potentially including Britain and France was briefly proposed in the 1860s, during the American Civil War, following the Trent Incident in which the Union navy stopped a British vessel and removed two Confederate diplomats. Ultimately, the two countries did not form a league but maintained the principle of the freedom of the seas, and both remained neutral.

Preceded by Battle of Hohenlinden	French Revolution: Revolutionary campaigns Second League of Armed Neutrality	Succeeded by Treaty of Lunéville
