= List of Pennsylvania suffragists =

This is a list of Pennsylvania suffragists, suffrage groups and others associated with the cause of women's suffrage in Pennsylvania.

== Conventions ==
- Pennsylvania Woman's Convention at West Chester in 1852.
- 5th National Women's Rights Convention, held in Philadelphia 1854.

== Groups ==
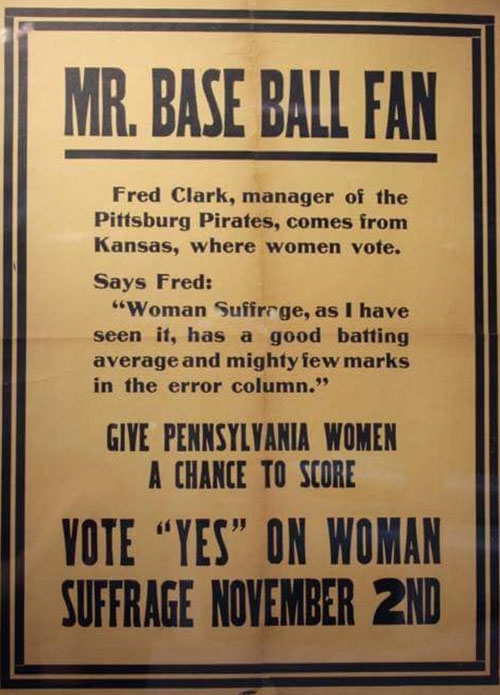
"Mr. Base Ball Fan Vote yes on Woman Suffrage" Pittsburgh Pirates flier

- Allegheny County Equal Rights Association (ACERA), formed in 1904.
- Chester County Equal Suffrage Association.
- Citizen's Suffrage Association, formed in Philadelphia in 1872.
- Equal Franchise Federation of Western Pennsylvania, formed on February 21, 1910.
- Equal Franchise Society of Philadelphia.
- Equal Rights Association, formed in Philadelphia in 1866.
- Equal Franchise Federation of Pittsburgh.
- Lackawanna County Equal Franchise League.
- Lucy Stone Woman Suffrage League (Pittsburgh).
- Northwestern Pennsylvania Equal Franchise Association.
- Pennsylvania College Equal Suffrage League, formed in 1908.
- Pennsylvania Men's League for Woman Suffrage, formed in March 1912.
- Pennsylvania Woman Suffrage Association, created in 1869.
- Woman Suffrage Party of Chester County.
- Woman Suffrage Society of Philadelphia, formed in 1892.
- Woman's Christian Temperance Union (WCTU).
- Women's Suffrage Society of Monroe County.

== Suffragists ==
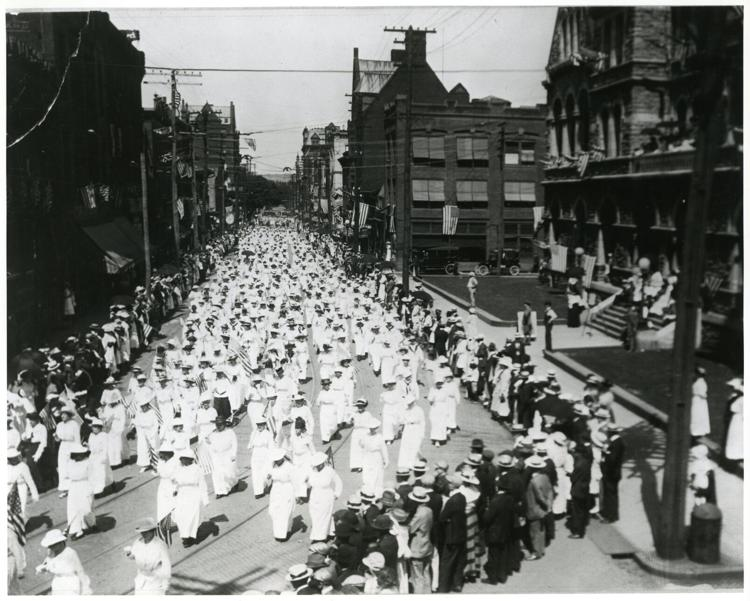
- Suffragists marching in Williamsport, Pennsylvania, c. 1917
  Lida Stokes Adams.
- Wilmer Atkinson (Philadelphia).
- Rachel Foster Avery (Philadelphia).
- Mary E. Bakewell (Pittsburgh).
- Flora Snyder Black (Meyersdale).
- Lucretia Longshore Blankenburg (Philadelphia).
- Jennie Bronenberg (Philadelphia).
- Mary A. Burnham (Philadelphia, Powleton).
- Jane Campbell (Philadelphia).
- Annie D. Chisholm (Huntington).
- Lavinia Nelson Clarke (Erie).
- Jennie Cleveland (Erie).
- Isaac Clothier (Pittsburgh).
- JoAnna Connell (Erie).
- Cora Crawford (Philadelphia).
- Addie Whiteman Dickerson (Philadelphia).
- Lavinia Dock (Fairfield).
- Alice Dunbar Nelson (Philadelphia).
- Rose Fishstein (Philadelphia).
- Augusta Fleming (Erie).
- Margaretta Forten (Philadelphia).
- Gertrude Fuller (Pittsburgh).
- Mary Grew.
- Reba Gomborov (Philadelphia).
- Angelina Grimké (Philadelphia).
- Sarah Moore Grimké (Philadelphia).
- Louise Hall (Philadelphia).
- Frances Harper (Philadelphia).
- Charles T. Heaslip.
- Kate C. Heffelfinger (Shamokin).
- Elizabeth McShane Hilles.
- Matilda Hindman.
- Liliane Stevens Howard (Philadelphia).
- Hannah Clothier Hull (Pittsburgh).
- Jane Hunt (Philadelphia).
- Mary Ingham (Philadelphia).
- Harriet C. Johnson (Philadelphia).
- Caroline Katzenstein (Philadelphia).
- Jennie E. Kennedy (Pittsburgh).
- Julian Kennedy (Pittsburgh).
- Alice Paisley Flack Kiernan (Somerset).
- Caroline Burnham Kilgore (Philadelphia).
- Daisy Elizabeth Adams Lampkin (Pittsburgh).
- Mary Flinn Lawrence (Pittsburgh).
- Dora Kelly Lewis (Philadelphia).
- Sarah Hunt Lockrey (1863–1929) – physician and suffragist.
- Elizabeth McShane (Philadelphia).
- Lucy Kennedy Miller (Pittsburgh).
- Winifred Barron Meek Morris (Pittsburgh).
- Gertrude Bustill Mossell (Philadelphia).
- Lucretia Mott (Philadelphia).
- Gertrude Bustill Mossell (Philadelphia).
- Mary H. Newbold.
- Mary Irvin Thompson Orlady (Huntington).
- Anna M. Orme.
- Hannah J. Patterson (Pittsburgh).
- Charlotte Woodward Pierce (Philadelphia).
- Odessa Hunter Plate (Erie County).
- Jane Weir Pressly (Erie).
- Ellen H. E. Price (Philadelphia).
- Margaret Wilson Pryor (Philadelphia).
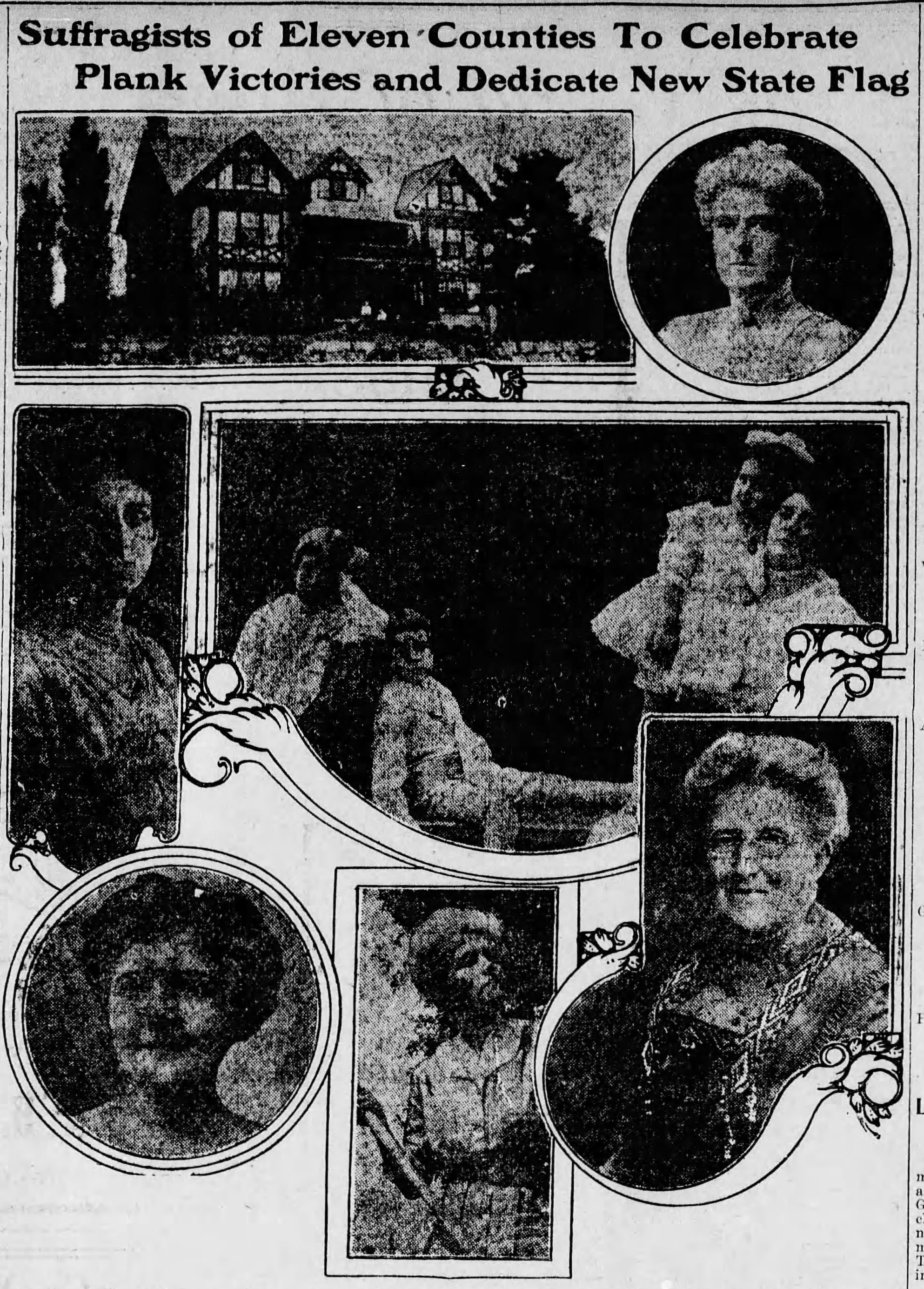
  "Suffragists of Eleven Counties to Celebrate Plank Victories and Dedicate New State Flag" June 1, 1916 (cropped)
- Sarah Pugh.
- Harriet Forten Purvis (Philadelphia).
- Robert Purvis (Philadelphia).
- Katherine S. Reed.
- Jennie Bradley Roessing (Pittsburgh).
- Katharine Wentworth Ruschenberger (Chester County).
- Helen Stone Schluraff (Erie County).
- Edna Schoyer (Pittsburgh).
- Marion Margery Scranton.
- Helen Semple (Titusville).
- Eliza Kennedy Smith (Pittsburgh), also known as Eliza Jane Kennedy.
- Mary Spencer (Erie).
- Althea Staples (Monroe County).
- Lily Helen Dupuy Steele (Pittsburgh).
- Sara Yorke Stevenson (Philadelphia).
- Jane Swisshelm (Pittsburgh).
- Martha Gibbons Thomas (Chester County).
- Eliza Sproat Turner (Philadelphia).
- Ellen Winsor (Haverford).
- Mary Winsor (Haverford).
- Mary M. Wolfe (Philadelphia).
- Mabel Woodward Wright (Erie).
- Emma Writt (Pittsburgh).

=== Politicians supporting women's suffrage ===
- Samuel Ashbridge.
- Dimner Beeber (Philadelphia).
- William Cameron Sproul.

== Places ==
- Justice Bell on display at Washington Memorial Chapel (Valley Forge).

== Publications ==
- Woman's Progress, first published in 1893.

== Suffragists campaigning in Pennsylvania ==
- Susan B. Anthony.
- Henry Browne Blackwell.
- Mary C. C. Bradford.
- Carrie Chapman Catt.
- Mary Dennett.
- Charlotte Perkins Gilman.
- Laura Gregg.
- Beatrice Forbes-Robertson Hale.
- Laura M. Johns.
- Clara Schlee Laddey.
- Nellie McClung.
- Inez Milholland.
- Alice Paul.
- Anna Howard Shaw.
- Laura de Turczynowicz.
- Ruza Wenclawska.
- Elizabeth Upham Yates.

== Antisuffragists ==
Groups

- Pittsburgh chapter of the National Association Opposed to Woman Suffrage (NAOWS), formed in 1911.

== See also ==
- List of historical Pennsylvania women
- Timeline of women's suffrage in Pennsylvania
- Women's suffrage in Pennsylvania
- Women's suffrage in states of the United States
- Women's suffrage in the United States
