= Women's suffrage in Pennsylvania =

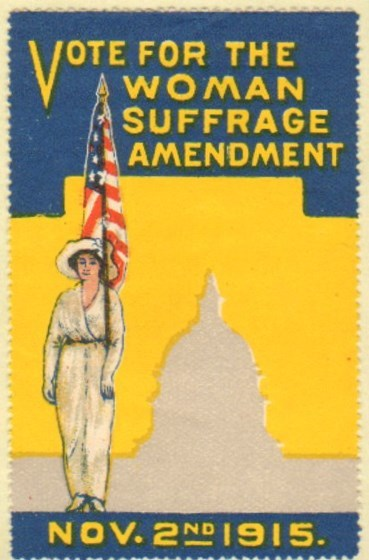
"Vote for the Woman Suffrage Amendment" stamp 1915

The women's suffrage movement in Pennsylvania was an outgrowth of the abolitionist movement in the state. Early women's suffrage advocates in Pennsylvania wanted equal suffrage not only for white women but for all African Americans. The first women's rights convention in the state was organized by Quakers and held in Chester County in 1852. Philadelphia would host the fifth National Women's Rights Convention in 1854. Later years saw suffragists forming a statewide group, the Pennsylvania Woman Suffrage Association (PWSA), and other smaller groups throughout the state. Early efforts moved slowly but steadily, with suffragists raising awareness and winning endorsements from labor unions.

In 1915, Pennsylvania had a voter referendum on women's suffrage in 1915 Pennsylvania Amendment 1. The campaign for the vote, held on November 2, was large. It included suffragists from around the country, the publication of The Suffrage Cookbook, the casting of a "Justice Bell," and major car parades. The Justice Bell, as well as many suffragists accompanying it, visited every county in Pennsylvania and traveled 3,935 miles on the back of a truck. Despite the efforts, women's suffrage failed at the polls. After the referendum failed, suffragists continued to raise money and work towards their goals. Some Pennsylvania suffragists joined the National Woman's Party (NWP) and protested outside the White House. Pennsylvania became the seventh state to ratify the Nineteenth Amendment on June 24, 1919. Women in the state voted for the first time on November 2, 1920, and the League of Women Voters (LWV) of Pennsylvania was formed on November 18, 1920.

== Early efforts ==
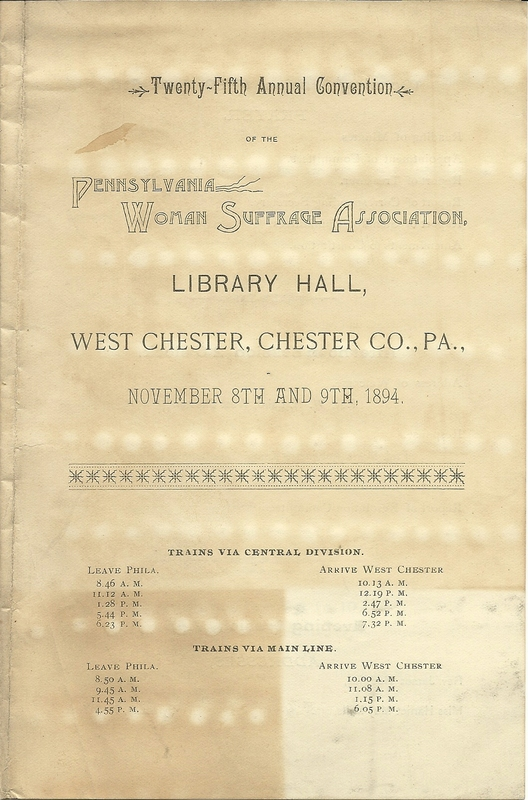
25th Annual Convention of the Pennsylvania Woman Suffrage Association, November 1894 05

Women's suffrage efforts grew out of abolitionist groups in Pennsylvania. Pennsylvania held its first woman's rights convention in Chester County on June 2–3 in 1852. Jacob Painter, a Quaker from Delaware County, chose to hold the convention in Chester County and Hannah M. Darlington organized it. During the convention the first resolution heard concerned voting rights for women. Later, the fifth National Women's Rights Convention was held in Philadelphia on October 18–20, 1854. Lucretia Mott was a significant participant in both conventions. Darlington served as a secretary of the Philadelphia convention.

In 1866, the Equal Rights Association of Philadelphia was organized to advocate both for women's suffrage and suffrage for African Americans. Three years later, the Pennsylvania Woman Suffrage Association (PWSA) was formed in Philadelphia, with Mary Grew serving as president. Other early women involved with PWSA included Charlotte Woodward Pierce. During the first organizational meeting of the group in 1869, they discussed the oppressive nature of taxation without representation, and how women would "purify the political arena" if they could vote. On November 10, 1870, the first annual meeting of PWSA was held in Philadelphia. During the meeting the group announced that PWSA would be affiliating with the American Woman Suffrage Association (AWSA) which had recently been organized. In 1872, Grew requested that all Pennsylvanian's interested in women's suffrage please send their information to PWSA.

On October 10, 1871, Caroline Burnham Kilgore attempted to cast her vote in Philadelphia. She took her case to the Supreme Court of Pennsylvania, where her appeal was denied. Her arguments about what made someone a citizen and what their rights should be were collected and published by the Citizen's Suffrage Association of Philadelphia. Susan B. Anthony and the National Woman Suffrage Association set up headquarters in Philadelphia on Chestnut Street in May 1875. The Philadelphia Citizens' Suffrage Association worked with NWSA to use the 100 year celebration of the American Revolution as a chance to promote women's suffrage. During the Centennial Exposition held in Philadelphia in 1876, suffragists were not able to officially secure a platform. Suffragists were undeterred, and "swarmed the event" where they read from the "Declaration and Protest of the Women of the United States" and distributed copies of the document among the huge crowd. Matilda Hindman went to the state legislature to lobby for a removal of the word "male" to describe voters in Pennsylvania. Letters to the state legislature were also sent, and the House passed a bill to remove the word "male" as a qualification for voters, but the bill did not pass the Senate.

Grew retired from the PWSA in 1892 and Lucretia Longshore Blankenburg took over as president. In 1895, PWSA created a list that showed all of the real estate and other property owned by women in Philadelphia. This was done to show that women represented a significant percentage of people who paid taxes without representation in the state. Several state suffrage conventions took place in Philadelphia in 1901, 1902, and 1903. At the November 7, 1903 convention a banquet was held in honor of Anthony. Also during the 1903 convention, suffrage groups were able to present statistics collected on support for women's suffrage in the state. Around half of the 4,839 women canvassed supported women's suffrage in the state, while less than a third were anti-suffrage, and the rest were indifferent.

Jennie Bradley Roessing, along with Mary E. Bakewell, Mary Flinn, Lucy Kennedy, and Hannah J. Patterson founded the Allegheny County Equal Rights Association (ACERA) in 1904. The suffragists asked Julian Kennedy to lead ACERA. ACERA hosted the PWSA convention on November 6–8 in 1907. During that convention, suffragists suggested asking political parities in the state to put women's suffrage in their platforms, but the suggestion was voted down as "impracticable." ACERA was later replaced by the Equal Franchise Federation of Western Pennsylvania (EFFWP) in 1910 and retained most of the same membership. In 1905, ACERA supported the nomination of five women to run as school directors. The women included Lidie C. W. Koethen, Minora Florence Phillis, Margaret Negley, Mary Lashley, and Kate C. McKnight, who was an incumbent.

In 1910, the state Federation of Labor pledged to support women's suffrage and candidates who believed in equal suffrage. Activists from PWSA set up headquarters in Philadelphia in the same year. PWSA held street meetings in Philadelphia and were well received by the public. PWSA also lobbied and convinced the Pennsylvania State Legislature to conduct women's suffrage hearings in 1911. The women's suffrage hearings, which took place on March 2, 1912, ultimately proved disappointing when members of the Electoral Commission "ruled that woman suffrage was not germane to its task." In 1911, suffragists in Pittsburgh set up headquarters and a library in their own city. Bakewell, Kennedy, and Roessing were all involved in creating the "Pittsburgh Plan" for women's suffrage. This plan, which combined women's education and new lobbying techniques, had effects on the women's suffrage movement countrywide. One key aspect of the Pittsburgh Plan was recognition of the need to train suffragists how to do effective public speaking and lobbying. In 1911 and 1912, Alice Paul organized two well-attended open-air rallies at Independence Square in Philadelphia. The first rally included Paul, Inez Milholland, and Anna Howard Shaw as speakers. The second rally had twenty decorated cars with "Votes for Women Banners" which brought many of the speakers to the event. Shaw and Mary Ware Dennett were both speakers in 1912. PWSA held their annual conference in Philadelphia in November where it was suggested that headquarters be moved to Harrisburg. The suffragists moved to Harrisburg by December 1912.

On May 2, 1914, Pittsburgh held an integrated women's suffrage parade with both Black and white suffragists marching together. The parade was led by Jennie E. Kennedy who was closely followed by Bakewell and Roessing. The large parade started at the Monongahela Wharf, traveled downtown, then to Schenley Park and back downtown to the Jenkins Arcade Building.

== State suffrage amendment ==
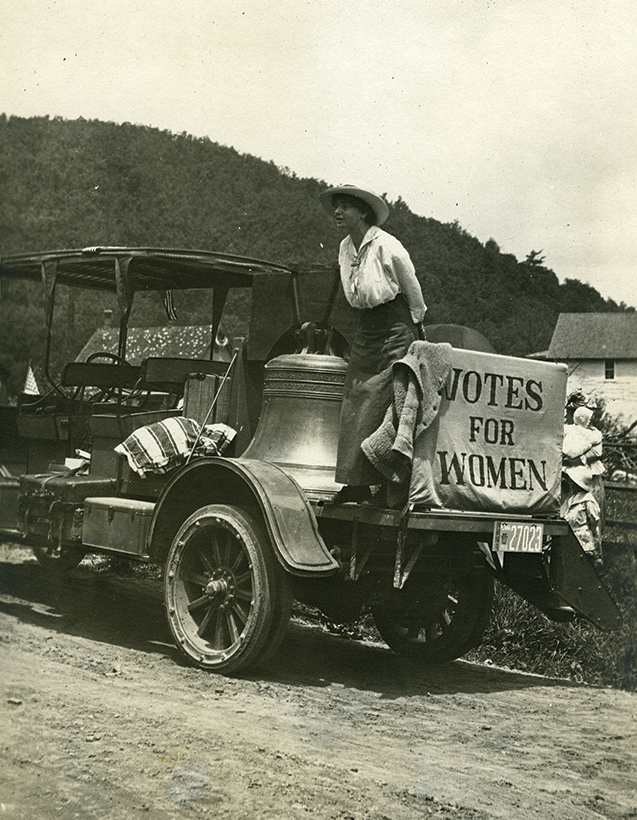
Louise Hall speaking from the platform of the Justice Bell Truck in Pennsylvania in summer of 1915

Suffragists in Pennsylvania wanted to see a women's suffrage amendment go out to vote in 1915, which meant that measures needed to pass in the state legislature two consecutive sessions in a row. Roessing began to lobby the political boss, Senator Boies Penrose, on women's suffrage in 1913. As she and other suffragists spoke to lawmakers, the support for a women's suffrage amendment grew from only 9 supporting to 25 for and 25 against. One state senator, Walter McNichols, said he'd vote for women's suffrage "if he received a bona fide resolution from the American Federation of Labor's Central Labor Union of Scranton."

Patterson tracked down the Scranton union's leader, Stephen McDonald, at a meeting in Paterson, New Jersey. McDonald, angry that McNichols refused to accept the union resolution volunteered to go to Harrisburg. Patterson, Roessing, and Mrs. Maxwell Chapman, the president of the Scranton suffrage group, brought McDonald to Senator McNichol's desk where he gave the union's endorsement and "'advised' him to vote for the enabling act." McNichols changed his vote on the spot and the measure passed. Senator Penrose assured Roessing that the measure would also pass a second time.

In October 1913, PWSA held their annual meeting in Pittsburgh. At the meeting, Roessing told the suffragists that the budget would be significantly increased in order to accommodate the upcoming campaign in 1915. Philanthropist, Elizabeth Dohrman Thaw, pledged $10,000 and the Pittsburgh Equal Franchise Federation (PEFF) promised $5,000. By 1914, suffragists in the state had a professionally-run press department that distributed the latest suffrage news around the state.

During the campaign for the vote, suffragists visited every county in Pennsylvania. Anna Howard Shaw gave 28 lectures in the state. Allegheny County ran a tight campaign that sent weekly suffrage bulletins and cartoons to local papers. Millions of pro-suffrage fliers in English, German, Hebrew, Italian, and Polish were distributed. In the Spring of 1915, the Equal Franchise Federation of Western Pennsylvania (EFFWP) published The Suffrage Cookbook in order to promote the idea of women's suffrage and to raise money for the movement. The book was not only full of recipes, but also included humor and celebrity endorsements of women's suffrage.

Katharine Wentworth Ruschenberger, collaborating with the PWSA, bought a "Justice Bell" that would not ring until women won the vote. The bell was part of the campaign leading up to the vote. The tour began in Sayre on June 23, 1915. Ruschenberger purchased a truck where she could mount the Justice Bell and show it around the state. The first stop attracted a large crowd who listened to Ruschenberger and others speak. On July 5, Roessing drove the Justice Bell truck to Schenley Park where a rally was taking place for Americanization Day and she and other suffragists "crashed" the event. Children, professionals, immigrants, and grandmothers participated and demanded the right for women to vote in Schenley Park. The Justice Bell traveled a total of 3,935 miles, around 50 miles a day.

In Pittsburgh, suffragists Lucy Kennedy Miller and Eliza Kennedy Smith, advertised the scores of the World Series and then spread the word about women's suffrage to onlookers. The suffragists were able to get the scores from the games by phone and then announce them in the downtown arcade. Around 10,000 people visited the suffragists' World Series announcements and heard their suffrage arguments as well as scores. On October 23, a street parade was held in Philadelphia. There were 150 cars in the parade, including a version of Shaw's Eastern Victory and the Burnham Winner. The state suffrage mascot, a toy fox terrier, Miss Mulford, rode with the Justice Bell. On the last Sunday before the election, ministers were requested to preach sermons about women's suffrage.

In Allentown, anti-suffragists attempted to discredit suffragists by using fraudulent tactics. PWSA in response set aside funds to fight voter fraud and attempts to discredit the suffrage movement. Philadelphia was a difficult city to run a campaign in due to rampant political corruption and competition between several suffrage groups in the city. On the day of vote, November 2, suffragists stationed themselves at the polls in order to make last-minute pleas for the vote. In the end, women's suffrage was voted down. One bright spot was that for the first time in United States history, a county the size of Allegheny won the suffrage vote.

== Road to ratification ==
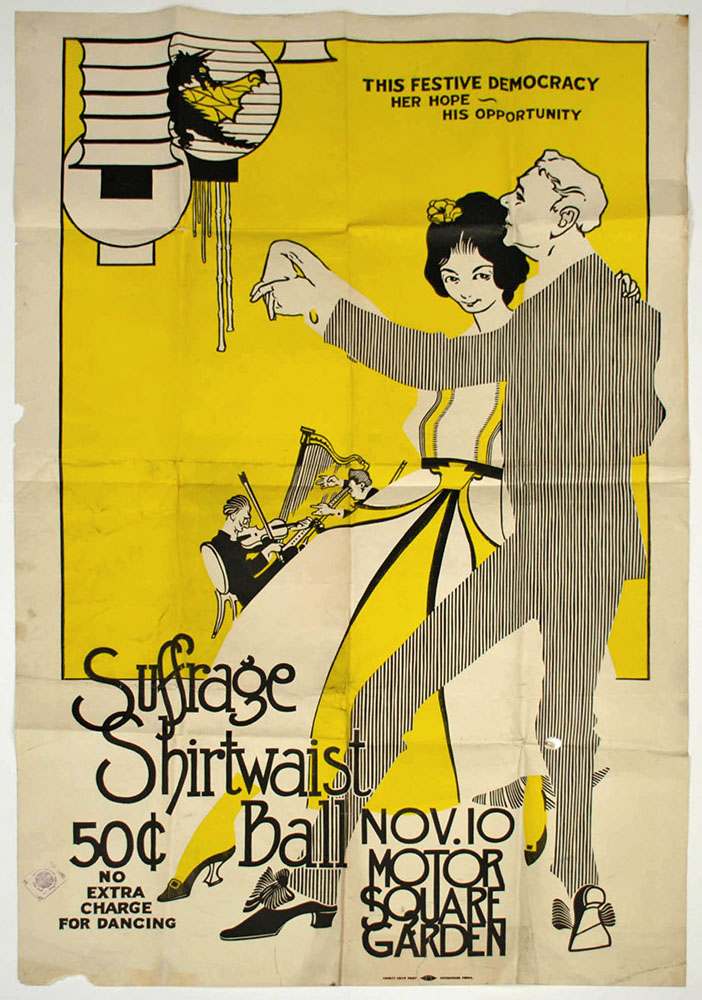
Suffrage Shirtwaist Ball, November 10, 1916, Motor Square Garden in Pittsburgh

In July 1916, more than 800 women rallied at the home of Alice Kiernan to celebrate the dedication of a Pennsylvania suffrage flag and the inclusion of women's suffrage in political party planks. Winifred Barron Meek Morris organized the Shirtwaist Ball in 1916 to raise money for women's suffrage. The ball was held at Motor Square Garden and around 3,000 people of all social classes attended the ball.

Dora Kelly Lewis was one of Pennsylvania's more radical suffragists, who protested outside the White House and was arrested during demonstrations. Lewis was one of the organizers of the hunger strike that took place in the Occoquan Workhouse where the suffragists were held. Other Pennsylvania suffragists who worked with the National Woman's Party (NWP) included Caroline Katzenstein and Mary A. Burnham. Burnham was the third largest donor to the NWP in 1916.

When the United States entered World War I on June 1, 1917, suffragists in Pennsylvania became involved in war work. Lucy Kennedy Miller was appointed to the National Woman's Liberty Loan Committee. Pennsylvania women raised $20,573 for the NAWSA Women's Oversea Hospitals fund.

When the Federal Suffrage Amendment passed the United States Congress in 1919, the state legislature stayed in session in order to review the amendment. The legislative committee of PWSA stayed too in order to lobby legislators to approve the amendment. The committee began an all out campaign starting on June 8. Pennsylvania ratified the Nineteenth Amendment on June 24 and was the seventh state to ratify. Hundreds of women were in Harrisburg to witness the vote from the gallery in the state capitol. The Justice Bell was finally rung on September 25, 1920, during a celebration of women's right to vote. Ruschenberger's niece, Katharine Wentworth, rung the bell for the first time.

As women registered to vote, they were "assessed" in order to verify their status as citizens as well as their ages and addresses. The first time women in Pennsylvania voted was on November 2, 1920. On November 18, 1920, PWSA dissolved and reformed as the League of Women Voters (LWV) of Pennsylvania.

== African-American suffragists in Pennsylvania ==
Frances Harper and Gertrude Bustill Mossell both worked for women's suffrage in Philadelphia. Mossell's column was one of the first written by a woman for the Black press in the United States. Daisy Elizabeth Adams Lampkin was involved in women's suffrage in Pittsburgh.

== Anti-suffragism in Pennsylvania ==
Liquor interests in Pennsylvania were worried that women voters would vote for temperance issues in the state, so they opposed women's suffrage.

A Pittsburgh chapter of the National Association Opposed to Woman Suffrage (NAOWS) was formed in Pittsburgh by Julia Morgan Harding. The Pennsylvania state chapter was headed by Mrs. Horace Brock. Harding was opposed to women's suffrage on the idea that it would lead to socialism and Mormonism. Pittsburgh anti-suffragists invited Minnie Bronson to speak on March 29, 1912, where over a hundred attended. In 1914 anti-suffragists campaigned opposite Pennsylvania suffragists at the Lebanon County fair. That same year, the first anti-suffrage convention in the United States was held in Harrisburg, Pennsylvania.

== See also ==
- Black suffrage in Pennsylvania
- List of Pennsylvania suffragists
- Timeline of women's suffrage in Pennsylvania
- Women's suffrage in states of the United States
- Women's suffrage in the United States
