= Timeline of women's suffrage in Pennsylvania =

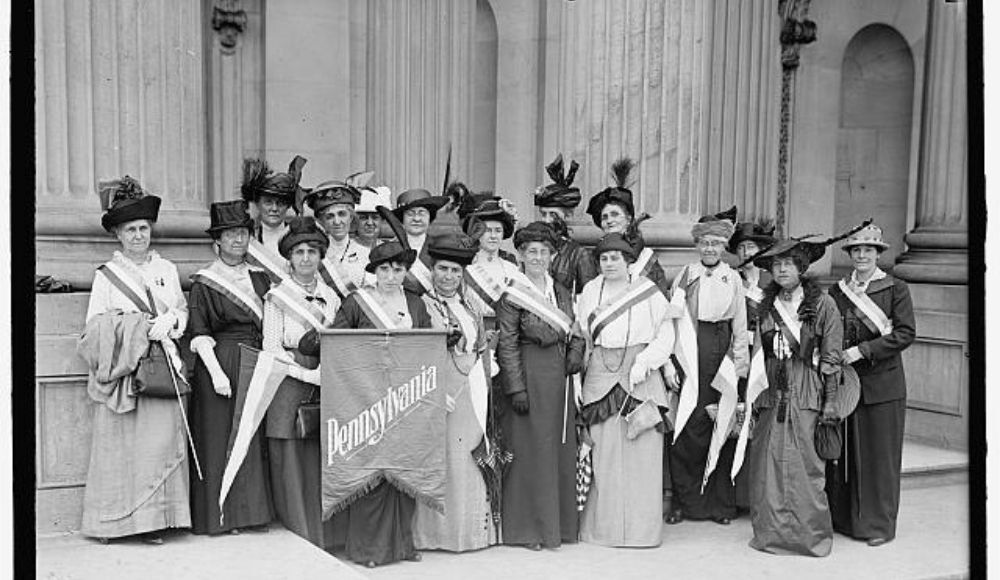
Pennsylvania suffragists in 1917

This is a timeline of women's suffrage in Pennsylvania. Activists in the state began working towards women's rights in the early 1850s, when two women's rights conventions discussed women's suffrage. A statewide group, the Pennsylvania Woman Suffrage Association (PWSA), was formed in 1869. Other regional groups were formed throughout the state over the years. Suffragists in Pittsburgh created the "Pittsburgh Plan" in 1911. In 1915, a campaign to influence voters to support women's suffrage on the November 2 referendum took place. Despite these efforts, the referendum failed. On June 24, 1919, Pennsylvania became the seventh state to ratify the Nineteenth Amendment. Pennsylvania women voted for the first time on November 2, 1920.

== 19th century ==
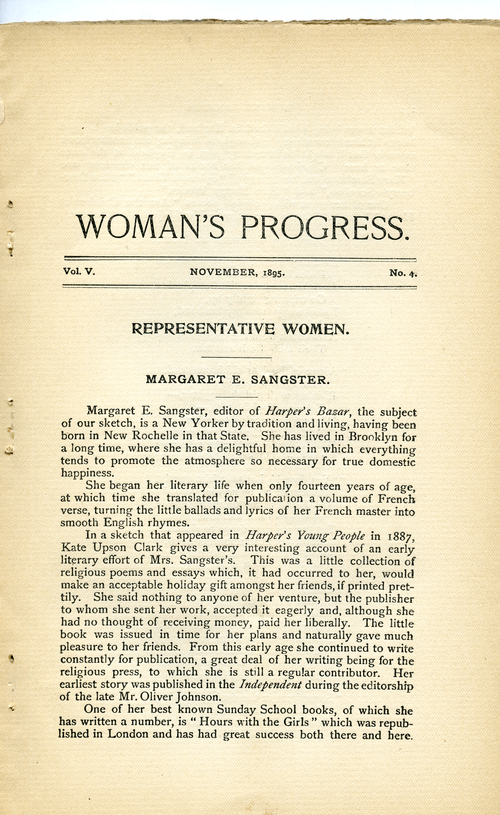
Woman's Progress periodical, November 1895

=== 1850s ===
1852

- First state women's rights convention is held in West Chester.

1854

- The Fifth National Women's Rights Convention is held in Philadelphia.

=== 1860s ===
1866

- The Equal Rights Association formed in Philadelphia was created to support African American and women's suffrage.

1869

- December 22: The Pennsylvania Woman Suffrage Association (PWSA) was formed.

=== 1870s ===
1871

- Caroline Burnham Kilgore attempts to vote in Philadelphia, is denied and takes her case to court.

1872

- The Citizen's Suffrage Association is formed in Philadelphia where it affiliates with the National Woman Suffrage Association (NWSA).

1876

- Suffragists are denied a booth at the Centennial Exposition in Philadelphia, but still manage to take the stage in front of an audience of 150,000 onlookers at Independence Square. Susan B. Anthony reads from A Declaration of Rights for Women.

=== 1880s ===
1885

- Matilda Hindman goes to Harrisburg to lobby the state legislature to remove the word "male" as a description of a voter in the state.

=== 1890s ===
1892

- The Woman Suffrage Society of Philadelphia is formed.

== 20th century ==
=== 1900s ===
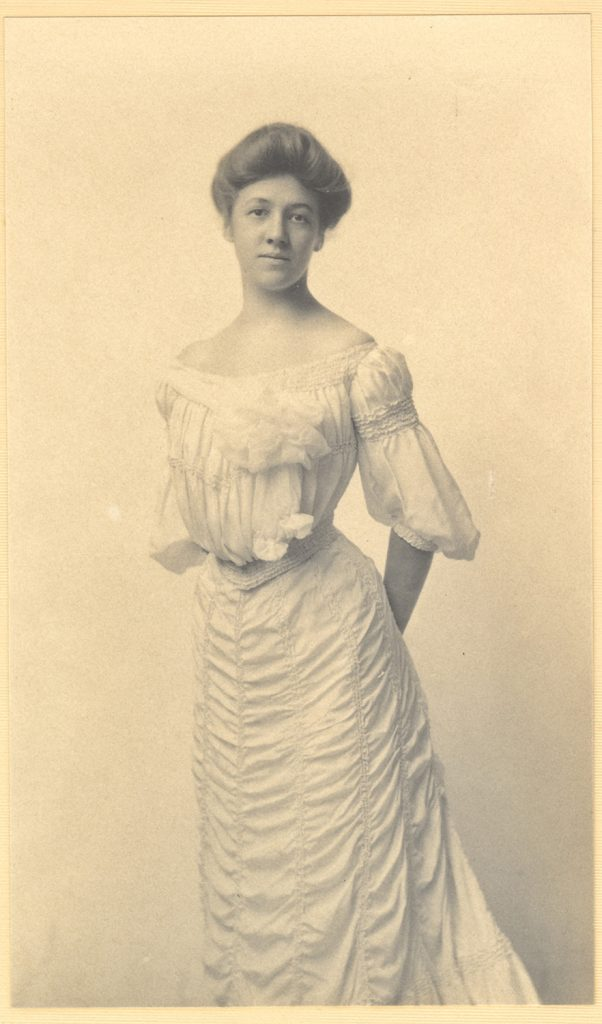
Lucy Kennedy Miller, c. 1900

1901

- November 26: State women's suffrage convention is held in Philadelphia.

1902

- November 7: State women's suffrage convention is held in Philadelphia.
- December 5: The Philadelphia Yearly Meeting of Friends creates an Equal Rights Association.

1903

- November 7: State women's suffrage convention is held in Philadelphia.

1904

- The Allegheny County Equal Rights Association (ACERA) is created.
- November 3–5: The state suffrage convention is held in Easton.

1905

- November 14: The state suffrage convention takes place in Philadelphia.

1906

- November 6–8: The State suffrage convention is held in Kennett Square.

1907

- November 6–8: ACERA hosts the PWSA convention in Pittsburgh.

1908

- November 4–6: The state suffrage convention is held in Norristown.

1909

- November 22–24: The state suffrage convention is held in Newton, Pennsylvania.

=== 1910s ===
1910

- Headquarters for PWSA is formed in Philadelphia.
- The new Equal Franchise Federation of Western Pennsylvania replaces ACERA.
- The state suffrage convention is held in Harrisburg.
- The Pennsylvania Federation of Labor pledged to support women's suffrage.

1911

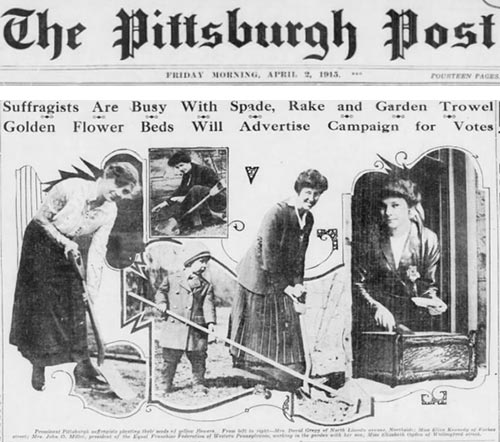
The Pittsburgh Post, "Suffragists Are Busy with Spade, Rake, and Garden Trowel" April 2, 1913

- March 14: Women's suffrage amendment hearing takes place in the state legislature, and the amendment is referred to a commission.
- September 30: Alice Paul's open-air suffrage campaign has its last stop in Independence Square in Philadelphia.
- Suffragists set up headquarters in Pittsburgh and create the "Pittsburgh Plan."

1912

- March: Pennsylvania chapter of the Men's League for Woman Suffrage is formed.
- March 12: The Electoral Commission rules that women's suffrage is not "germane to its task."
- March 22: The state women's suffrage commission reports during a hearing at the state legislature.
- March 29: Anti-suffragist, Minnie Bronson, speaks at the Pittsburgh Conservatory of Music.
- November 21: A second open-air rally is held in Independence Square in Philadelphia.
- November 26–27: State suffrage convention is held in Philadelphia. It is suggested that suffrage headquarters are moved.
- December: State suffrage headquarters are moved to Harrisburg.

1913

- January: Women's suffrage resolution is introduced in the state legislature, and passes narrowly. It will have to pass a second time to go to a voter referendum.
- First women's suffrage parade in the state takes place in Perry.
- July 8: A women's suffrage parade is held in Erie.
- August: Woman's suffrage day at the Granger's picnic in Williams Grove.
- October 28–30: PWSA meets in Pittsburgh, where money for the upcoming campaign is pledged, including a $10,000 pledge from philanthropist, Elizabeth Dohrman Thaw.

1914

- August: Suffragists and anti-suffragists campaign at the Lebanon County fair.
- The first anti-suffrage convention in the United States takes place in Harrisburg.
- Suffrage School is held in Pittsburgh.
- November 19–24: State suffrage convention is held in Scranton.

1915

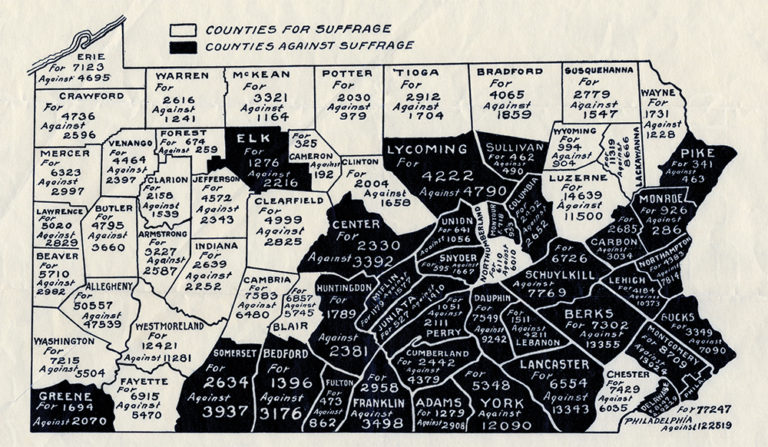
Pennsylvania women's suffrage referundum map 1915, produced by Pennsylvania Men's League for Women's Suffrage

- March 31: The Justice Bell is forged at the Meneely Bell Foundry.
- June 23: Suffragists take the Justice Bell on a tour of the state starting in Sayre.
- October: Suffragists show scores for the World Series at the Pittsburgh headquarters and hand out suffrage literature to the crowds that come to see the scores.
- November 2: The women's suffrage amendment is defeated at the polls.
- November 30: The state suffrage convention is held in Philadelphia.

1916

- Carrie Chapman Catt addresses a convention held in Harrisburg.
- July 7: The Pennsylvania Suffrage Flag is dedicated.
- November 21–24: The state suffrage convention is held in Williamsport, Pennsylvania.

1919

- June 24: Pennsylvania ratifies the 19th Amendment.
- November: PWSA dissolves and the League of Women Voters of Pennsylvania is formed.

=== 1920s ===
1920

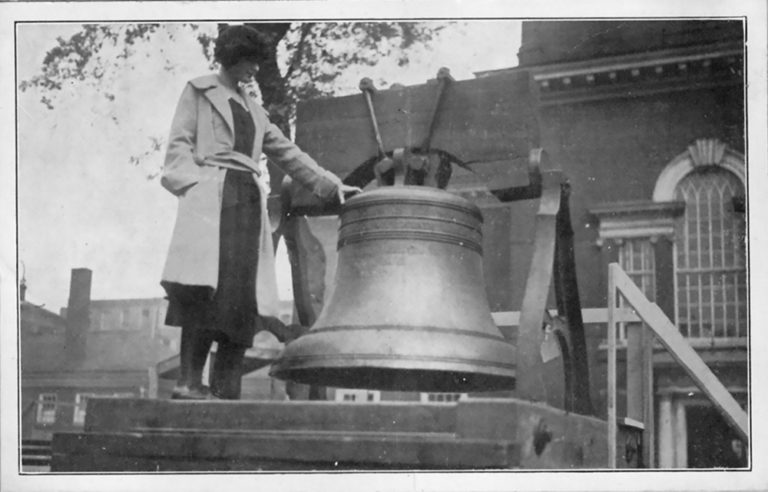
Catherine Wentworth with replica Liberty Bell outside Independence Hall September 1920 for 19th Amendment celebration

- September 25: The Justice Bell is finally rung at a celebration of women winning the right to vote where Katharine Wentworth is the first to ring the bell.
- November 2: Pennsylvania women vote for the first time.
- November 18: PWSA dissolves and reforms as the League of Women Voters (LWV) of Pennsylvania.

== See also ==
- List of Pennsylvania suffragists
- Women's suffrage in Pennsylvania
- Women's suffrage in states of the United States
- Women's suffrage in the United States
