= List of historical Pennsylvania women =

This is a list of prominent historical Pennsylvania women:

- Mary Ambler (1805–1868)
- Marian Anderson (1897–1993)/
- Nellie Bly (1864–1922)
- Pearl S. Buck
- Rachel Carson (1907–1964)
- Margaret Corbin (1754–1800)
- Henrietta Crosman
- Isabel Darlington (1865–1950)
- Lydia Darragh (1728–1789)
- Saint Katherine Drexel
- Eliza Clayland Tomlinson Foster
- Hannah Freeman
- Martha Glaser
- Elsie Hillman
- Emma Hunter
- Rebecca Lukens (1794–1854)
- Sophie Masloff
- Sybilla Masters (1676–1720)
- Lucy Kennedy Miller (1880-1962)
- Evelyn Foster Morneweck
- Lucretia Mott (1793–1880)
- Mary Engle Pennington (1872–1952)
- Ann Preston (1813–1872)
- Jennie Bradley Roessing
- Betsy Ross
- Marion Margery Scranton (1884–1960)
- Florence Seibert (1897–1991)
- Frances Slocum (1773–1847)
- Amanda Berry Smith (1837–1915)
- Anna Bustill Smith (1862-1945)
- Eliza Kennedy Smith (1889-1964)
- Ida Tarbell (1857–1944)
- Martha Gibbons Thomas (1869–1942)
- Elizabeth Thorn (1832–1907)
- Laurie Trok
- Marion Foster Welch
- Jane McDowell Foster Wiley

== See also ==
- List of Pennsylvania suffragists
