= Eliza Kennedy Smith =

American suffragist, civic activist, and government reformer

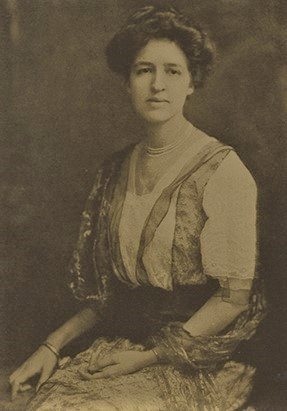
- Eliza Kennedy, 1915
- Born: Eliza Jane Kennedy; December 11, 1889; Latrobe, Pennsylvania, U.S.
- Died: October 23, 1964 (aged 74); Pittsburgh, Pennsylvania, U.S.
- Other names: Eliza Kennedy, Mrs. R. Templeton Smith
- Occupations: Suffragist, women's rights activist, and government reformer
- Spouse: R. Templeton Smith
- Parent(s): Julian Kennedy and Jennie E. Kennedy

Eliza Kennedy Smith (December 11, 1889 – October 23, 1964), also known as Mrs. R. Templeton Smith, was a 20th-century American suffragist, civic activist, and government reformer in Pittsburgh, Pennsylvania. Upon her death in 1964, The Pittsburgh Press described her as "a relentless, tenacious watchdog of the City's purse strings" who "probably attended more budget sessions over the years than anyone else in Pittsburgh either in or out of government".

Partnering with her sister, Lucy Kennedy Miller (1880–1962), and Jennie Bradley Roessing, Mary E. Bakewell, Hannah J. Patterson, and Mary Flinn Lawrence during the early 1900s, she helped to found the Allegheny County Equal Rights Association (later renamed as the Equal Franchise Federation of Western Pennsylvania and then the Allegheny County League of Women Voters). Named president of the Allegheny County League of Women Voters, she held that position from the early 1920s until the time of her death in 1964.

In addition, she collaborated with her sister, Lucy Kennedy Miller, to uncover Pittsburgh city government corruption. Their investigation led to Mayor Charles H. Kline's indictment by a grand jury on forty-eight counts of malfeasance and his subsequent conviction in 1932, which resulted in a six-month prison sentence.

== Formative years ==
Born as Eliza Jane Kennedy on December 11, 1889, in Latrobe, Pennsylvania, Eliza Kennedy Smith was a daughter of suffragists and women's rights advocates Jennie E. (Breneman) Kennedy (1852–1930) and Julian Kennedy (1852–1932) and the sibling of: Lucy Kennedy Miller (1880–1962), a prominent 20th-century American suffragist who became the first president of the Pennsylvania League of Women Voters (PLWV); Joseph Walker Kennedy (1884–1950); Julian Kennedy (1886–1955); Hugh Truesdale Kennedy (1888–1989); and Thomas Walker Kennedy (1894–1922). Her parents moved the Kennedy family to Pittsburgh when she was three years old.

A 1908 graduate of the Winchester Thurston School in Pittsburgh, she studied economics and political science at Vassar College, graduating in 1912.

On May 1, 1907, she served as the sole attendant for her sister, Lucy, when she married John Oliver Miller. The wedding was held at the Kennedy family's home on "Forbes Street, near Murdoch" in Pittsburgh, and was officiated by "the Rev. Dr. William J. Reid, pastor of the First Presbyterian Church." Their brothers J.J. Kennedy, Julian Kennedy Jr., and Thomas Walker Kennedy served as three of the groom's seven ushers.

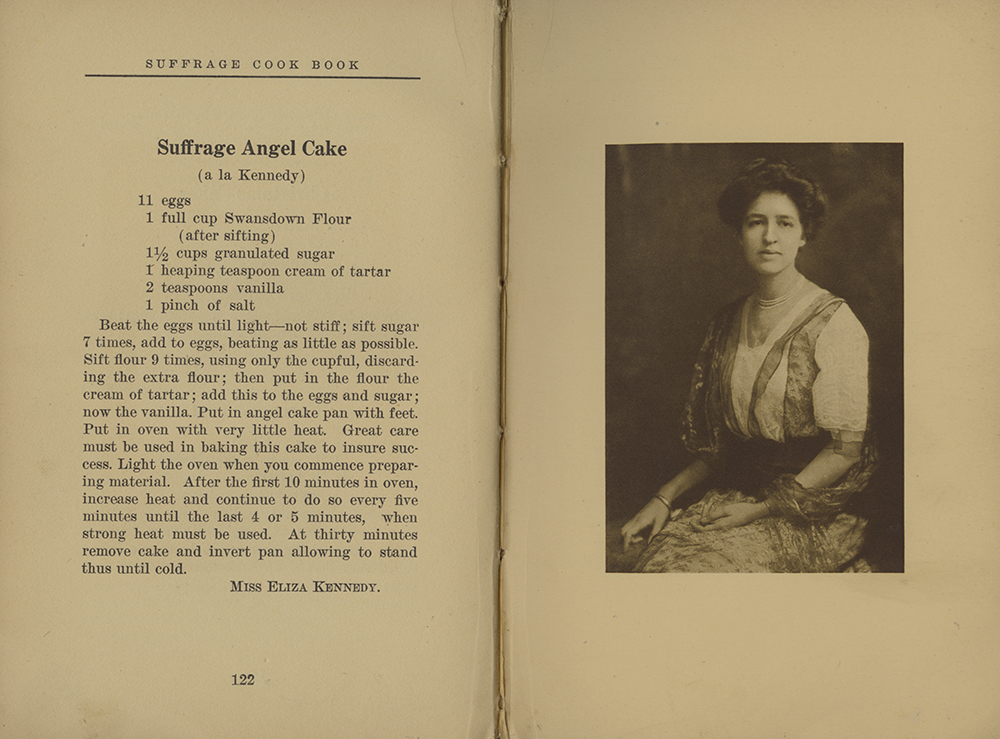
Eliza Kennedy's Suffrage Angel Cake recipe, 1915.

In 1915, her parents announced her engagement to Raymond Templeton Smith (1888–1967), a graduate of Cornell who subsequently went on to become an executive vice president of the Pittsburgh Coal Company. Her engagement party, which was held at her family's home on May 17 of that year became a women's suffrage advocacy night when her sister, Lucy Kennedy Miller, "president of the Equal Franchise Federation of Pittsburgh … called on several of the guests to give brief suffrage speeches." She married R. Templeton Smith later that year; they subsequently became the parents of sons Templeton Smith (1919–2007), who was born on August 19, 1919, and went on to become one of the first environmental lawyers in America; and Kennedy Smith (1922–1996), who was born in Pittsburgh on July 12, 1922.

== Suffrage and women's rights advocacy ==
Sometime around 1910, Eliza Kennedy and her sister, Lucy Kennedy Miller, and their mother, Jennie E. Kennedy, participated in suffrage advocacy training at a school run by Carrie Chapman Catt. The trio then took increasingly active roles in the suffrage movement at the city, county, and state levels, marching in suffrage parades, hosting suffrage events for young women, and lobbying state legislators to ratify the Nineteenth Amendment to the U.S. Constitution.

Partnering with her sister Lucy and fellow suffragists Jennie Bradley Roessing, Mary E. Bakewell, Hannah J. Patterson, and Mary Flinn Lawrence, Eliza Kennedy Smith also helped to create the Allegheny County Equal Rights Association (later renamed as the Equal Franchise Federation of Western Pennsylvania), and served as the organization's treasurer. After the Nineteenth Amendment was ratified in June 1919 and leaders of Pennsylvania's suffrage movement determined that suffrage organization names should be updated to reflect their changing missions, officers of the Equal Franchise Federation of Western Pennsylvania formally changed their chapter's name to the Allegheny County League of Women Voters in August 1920. Eliza Kennedy Smith subsequently assumed the role of president, and held that job from 1924 until her death in 1964.

== Anti-corruption fighter and government watchdog ==
Between the 1930s and 1950s, she collaborated with her sister, Lucy Kennedy Miller, to uncover Pittsburgh city government corruption. Exposing the profligate spending and improper city contract awards of Mayor Charles H. Kline, their investigation led to Kline's indictment by a grand jury on forty-eight counts of malfeasance. Convicted in 1932, he received a six-month prison sentence.

A "relentless, tenacious watchdog of the City's purse strings" who "probably attended more budget sessions over the years than anyone else in Pittsburgh either in or out of government," according to The Pittsburgh Press, Eliza Kennedy Smith "spearheaded drives for grand jury investigations into rackets and alleged vote frauds" and "hounded … both Republican and Democratic administrations," monitoring "nearly every facet of City government from bridge painters to rubbish collectors" in a non-partisan manner. In 1932, she was appointed by Mayor William N. McNair as his budget advisor, but was frustrated during her two-year tenure, when she "couldn't even get a look at budget figures." During one of her investigations, she noticed that garbage collectors were taking advantage of the city's policy to pay "by the pound" by "watering down the refuse in order to collect a higher fee." During the 1940s, she "led the fight for a revamped and modern central communications center in the police bureau," following a "wave of sex slayings." That new communications center opened in 1950.

== Later life ==
In 1964, she was photographed with her granddaughter, Eliza Smith, and U.S. Navy Admiral Ben Moreell for a Pittsburgh Press article, which reported that she and Moreell were supporters of U.S. Senator Barry Goldwater, a Republican from Arizona who was running to become president of the United States. She and Moreell were seeking election as delegates to that year's Republican National Convention, and had "committed themselves unequivocally to vote for Senator Goldwater at the convention beginning with the first ballot and continuing until Goldwater [was] nominated or [withdrew] his name."

She and her husband resided for many years at 1336 Shady Avenue in Pittsburgh's Squirrel Hill neighborhood.

== Illness, death, and interment ==
Diagnosed with carcinoma of the sigmoid colon during the spring of 1963, her health continued to decline as the cancer metastasized and spread to her lungs. She was initially cared for at the Presbyterian Hospital in Pittsburgh, before she returned to her Squirrel Hill home in the fall of 1964. She died in her sleep there at the age of 74 on October 23, 1964, from complications related to cancer and arteriosclerotic cardiovascular disease. Her son Kennedy Smith served as the informant on the death certificate. H. Samson Inc. of Pittsburgh, Pennsylvania handled her funeral arrangements. She was buried at the Homewood Cemetery in Pittsburgh on October 26, 1964.

On June 10, 1965, her leadership and activism were memorialized by the U.S. House of Representatives in its Congressional Record by U.S. Congressman James G. Fulton who described her as "one of our most honored citizens in the city of Pittsburgh ... whose tireless efforts over the years gave so much toward improving the civic life and governmental structure of Pittsburgh."

== See also ==
- List of Pennsylvania suffragists
- Women's suffrage in Pennsylvania
- National American Woman Suffrage Association
