= Lucy Kennedy Miller =

American politician

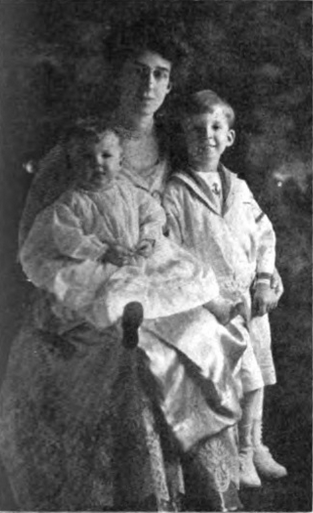
- Lucy Kennedy Miller and children, 1919
- Born: Lucy B. Kennedy; October 11, 1880; Braddock, Pennsylvania
- Died: June 30, 1962 (aged 81); Pittsburgh, Pennsylvania
- Other names: Lucy K. Miller, Mrs. John O. Miller
- Occupations: Suffragist, women's rights activist, and government reformer
- Spouse: John Oliver Miller (m. 1907)
- Parent(s): Julian Kennedy and Jennie E. Kennedy

Lucy Kennedy Miller (1880–1962), also known as Mrs. John O. Miller, was a prominent 20th-century American suffragist who became the president of the Equal Franchise Federation of Pittsburgh, Pennsylvania and the first president of the Pennsylvania League of Women Voters (PLWV). In 1919, the League of Women Citizens of Pennsylvania (forerunner of the PLWV) called her "the woman to whom, more than to any other" was "owe[d] the triumph of" women's suffrage in the Commonwealth of Pennsylvania.

A co-founder, with Mary E. Bakewell, of a school for suffragists that recruited teachers from the University of Pittsburgh faculty, Miller became the first woman to ever address the Pennsylvania State Legislature, following the ratification of the Nineteenth Amendment to the United States Constitution by the Pennsylvania General Assembly in June 1919. In addition, she collaborated with her sister, Eliza Kennedy Smith, to uncover Pittsburgh city government corruption between the 1930s and 1950s, exposing profligate spending and improper city contract awards made by Mayor Charles H. Kline. Their investigation led to Kline’s indictment by a grand jury on forty-eight counts of malfeasance and his subsequent conviction in 1932, which resulted in a six-month prison sentence.

== Formative years ==
Born as Lucy B. Kennedy on October 11, 1880, in Braddock, Pennsylvania, Lucy Kennedy Miller was a daughter of suffragists and women's rights advocates Jennie E. (Breneman) Kennedy (1852–1930) and Julian Kennedy (1852–1932) and the sibling of: Joseph Walker Kennedy (1884–1950); Julian Kennedy (1886–1955); Hugh Truesdale Kennedy (1888–1989); Eliza Jane Kennedy (1889–1964), who later wed R. Templeton Smith; and Thomas Walker Kennedy (1894–1922). Sometime around 1892, her parents moved the Kennedy family from Latrobe, Pennsylvania, where her sister Eliza was born, to Pittsburgh.

A graduate of the Winchester Thurston School in Pittsburgh, she graduated from Vassar College in 1902.

She continued to reside at her parents' home on "Forbes Street, near Murdoch" in Pittsburgh until Wednesday, May 1, 1907, when she married John Oliver Miller. The wedding was held at her family's home, and was officiated by "the Rev. Dr. William J. Reid, pastor of the First Presbyterian Church." Her sister, Eliza, served as her sole attendant while her brothers J.J. Kennedy, Julian Kennedy Jr., and Thomas Walker Kennedy served as three of the groom's seven ushers. Miller's brother, J.D. Miller, was the best man. They had three children: Julian Kennedy Miller, Eliza Jane Miller (1914–2007), who was born on December 30, 1914, and became a renowned artist; and Barbara Miller Shefler (1920-1957)

== Suffrage and women's rights advocacy ==
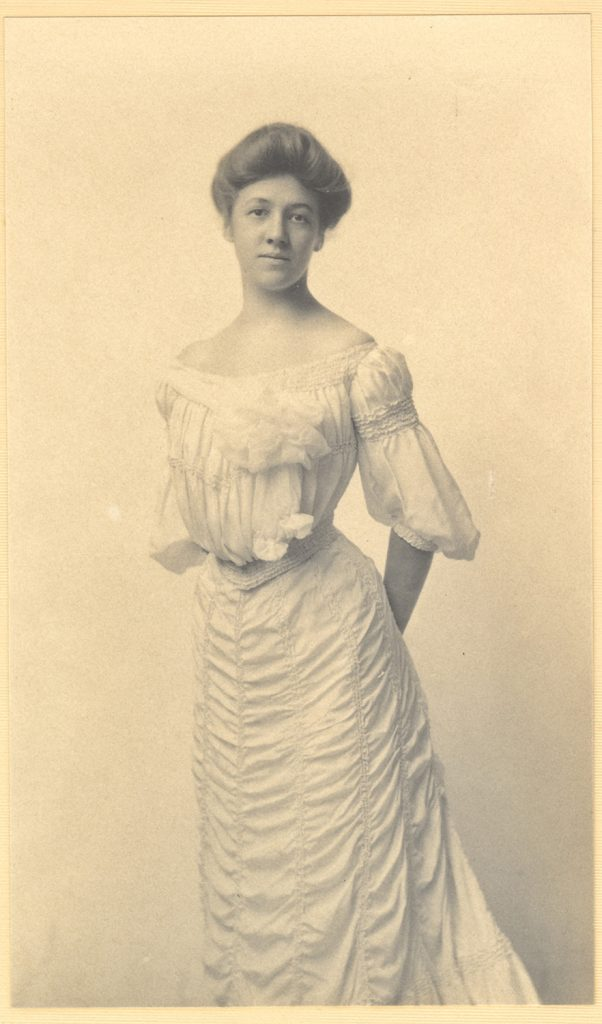
Lucy Kennedy Miller, circa 1900.

Two years into her marriage, Lucy Kennedy Miller joined Pittsburgh's suffrage movement. Initially an attendee at suffrage meetings, she began hosting educational events for young women. An increasingly prominent authority figure, she helped to create the Allegheny County Equal Rights Association (later renamed as the Equal Franchise Federation of Western Pennsylvania), becoming the organization's treasurer and president in 1912.

That same year, she briefly became the assistant city editor of the Pittsburgh Post when she and fifteen other suffragists from the Equal Franchise Federation of Western Pennsylvania were given permission by the newspaper's management to write and produce the February 29 edition of the publication. A "Women's Suffrage Edition," the sixteen women "wrote news stories, editorials and critical reviews … conducted interviews," and "showcased the accomplishments of women in art, music and drama alongside celebrity endorsements from the leading ladies of the day," according to Eliza Smith Brown. "One news item welcomed the first Colored Women's Equal Franchise League of Pittsburgh to the struggle…. Suffrage news from abroad cited progress in more than 20 countries." Euphemia Bakewell, a longtime Post contributor, was awarded the job of managing editor, and was also placed in charge of the pressroom, which was under the control of the International Printing and Pressmen and Assistants' Union of North America. The union's secretary, W.J. Smith, issued her a limited-term membership to "work in the pressroom of The Pittsburgh Sun" with "all union privileges for this one day." Euphemia's sister and federation president Mary Bakewell wrote the editorials and poetry while Jennie Bradley Roessing and Lucy Kennedy Miller handled the city desk assignments. On print day, Euphemia "threw the hefty lever that set the spinning rolls and whirring wheels in motion. And as the first damp paper came off the presses, she took hold of it triumphantly." Thousands of women were then given newspaper bundles for distribution via "limousines and on foot" across Pittsburgh. Brown notes that "The paper contained more local advertising than any other Pittsburgh paper that day, and its circulation was the highest in the Sun's history."

Lucy Kennedy Miller subsequently became president of the Pennsylvania Equal Franchise Federation, which further elevated her stature and made her a key point of contact for journalists of the era who were reporting on the suffrage movement.

Asked about her reasons for joining the suffrage movement, while visiting with suffragists from Erie, Pennsylvania, in 1913, she said, "We have been trying to get a children's labor law in Pennsylvania the past 14 years, and the only way we will get it is to get the vote."

She also co-founded, with Mary Bakewell, a school for suffragists that recruited teachers from the University of Pittsburgh faculty and, in 1914, orchestrated a large parade to celebrate Suffrage Day. In 1915, on behalf of the Woman Suffrage Party, she wrote an appeal to Pennsylvania voters, urging them to press their legislators to ratify the 19th Amendment.

Roughly four years later, when the Nineteenth Amendment to the U.S. Constitution was ratified by the Pennsylvania General Assembly in June 1919, she became the first woman to ever address the Pennsylvania State Legislature. In her remarks that day, she said:

"When New York granted suffrage to its women in 1917 in the midst of the rejoicing for the victory, the Pennsylvania women felt chagrined that their great state had not seen fit to deal out an equal measure of justice to them. But they all realized that the passage of the referendum bill in the State of New York meant a speedy victory in Congress because, with the gain of this largest state in the Union, it meant that the suffragists could bring enough pressure to bear on Congress to successfully pass their measure.

Pennsylvania today has taken her place by the side of New York because she has made possible by the ratification today the speedy ratification of the necessary 26 states. A year ago, when an analysis of ratification possibilities was made by Mrs. Catt, president of the National Woman Suffrage Association, Pennsylvania was rated as the most difficult of the 26.

The pendulum has swung so far, and it means that when this great Republican stronghold has come out for ratification that every other state will fall into line. Furthermore, it means that the Democrats in the Southern states will be forced to do equally as well unless they expect to see the prize of the votes of more than 25,000,000 women who already have been enfranchised snatched away from them in the presidential election of 1920."

Lucy Kennedy Miller also reportedly presented Pennsylvania's governor with a commemorative gift, which was engraved with about the historic achievement, as well as her "name, recorded for posterity, with no indication of her marital status … Lucy Kennedy Miller."

During the fall of that same year (1919), Miller and other leaders of the Pennsylvania Woman Suffrage Association determined that their organization's name should be updated. In a December 1919 address to the Allegheny Women's Suffrage Party, Mrs. Nathaniel Spear, the party's treasurer, explained the reason, and documented the significant role Lucy Kennedy Miller had played in securing the right to vote for women across Pennsylvania:

"In Philadelphia on Monday, November 10, the Pennsylvania Woman Suffrage Association became the League of Women Citizens of Pennsylvania. Upon this occasion, which marked the close of our work as suffragists and the beginning of our work as citizens, the women present thought it fitting to publicly recognize their debt to Mrs. John O. Miller the woman to whom, more than to any other, we owe the triumph of our cause in the state."

At that time, Lucy Kennedy Miller became the first president of the League of Women Citizens of Pennsylvania (forerunner of the League of Women Voters of Pennsylvania).

== Relocation to Maryland ==
In 1928, Lucy Kennedy Miller and her husband, John Oliver Miller, relocated to Talbot County, Maryland, where they had purchased Emerson Point from the Seth Family in 1928. Ownership of the historic property was transferred in 1964 to their daughter Eliza Jane Miller, who maintained control until her death in 2007.

== Anti-government corruption fight ==
Between the 1930s and 1950s, Lucy Kennedy Miller collaborated with her sister, Eliza Kennedy Smith, to uncover Pittsburgh city government corruption. Exposing the profligate spending and improper city contract awards of Mayor Charles H. Kline, their investigation led to Kline's indictment by a grand jury on forty-eight counts of malfeasance. Convicted in 1932, he received a six-month prison sentence.

== Illness and death ==
Diagnosed with carcinoma of the bowel, her health continued to decline, and she was hospitalized at the West Penn Hospital in Pittsburgh, where she died at the age of 81 from metastatic bowel cancer on June 30, 1962. Her son, Julian K. Miller served as the informant on her death certificate, which noted that she had been a resident of McDaniel, Maryland, prior to her hospitalization in Pennsylvania. H. Samson, Inc. of Pittsburgh arranged her funeral. Her body was then cremated at the Homewood Cemetery Crematory in Pittsburgh on July 2, 1962, and a memorial service was held at St. Michael’s Church in Maryland.

== Legacy ==
In a December 1919 address to the Allegheny Women's Suffrage Party, Mrs. Nathaniel Spear, the party's treasurer, announced that the League of Women Citizens of Pennsylvania (forerunner of the League of Women Voters of Pennsylvania) had established the Lucy Kennedy Miller Fund in recognition of the key role Miller had played in securing the right to vote for women in Pennsylvania:

"It was voted to raise in Pennsylvania an endowment fund to be known as the Lucy Kennedy Miller fund. The income from this fund will be administered by three trustees. Mrs. Miller, as long as she lives, will be one of these trustees. During Mrs. Miller's term as state chairman the two remaining trustees will be elected by the state board…. The income from the Lucy Kennedy Miller fund will in no case be applied to overhead expenses, but will be used for special educational and propaganda work undertaken by the League of Women Citizens. The Allegheny County delegation present at Philadelphia voted to raise a minimum of $2,000 as their contribution to this fund…. Mrs. Miller was deeply touched by the action of the convention and was greatly delighted that the recognition of her service took the broad form of an endowment fund."

== See also ==
- List of Pennsylvania suffragists
- Women's suffrage in Pennsylvania
- National American Woman Suffrage Association
