= Jennie E. Kennedy =

American clubwoman and suffragist

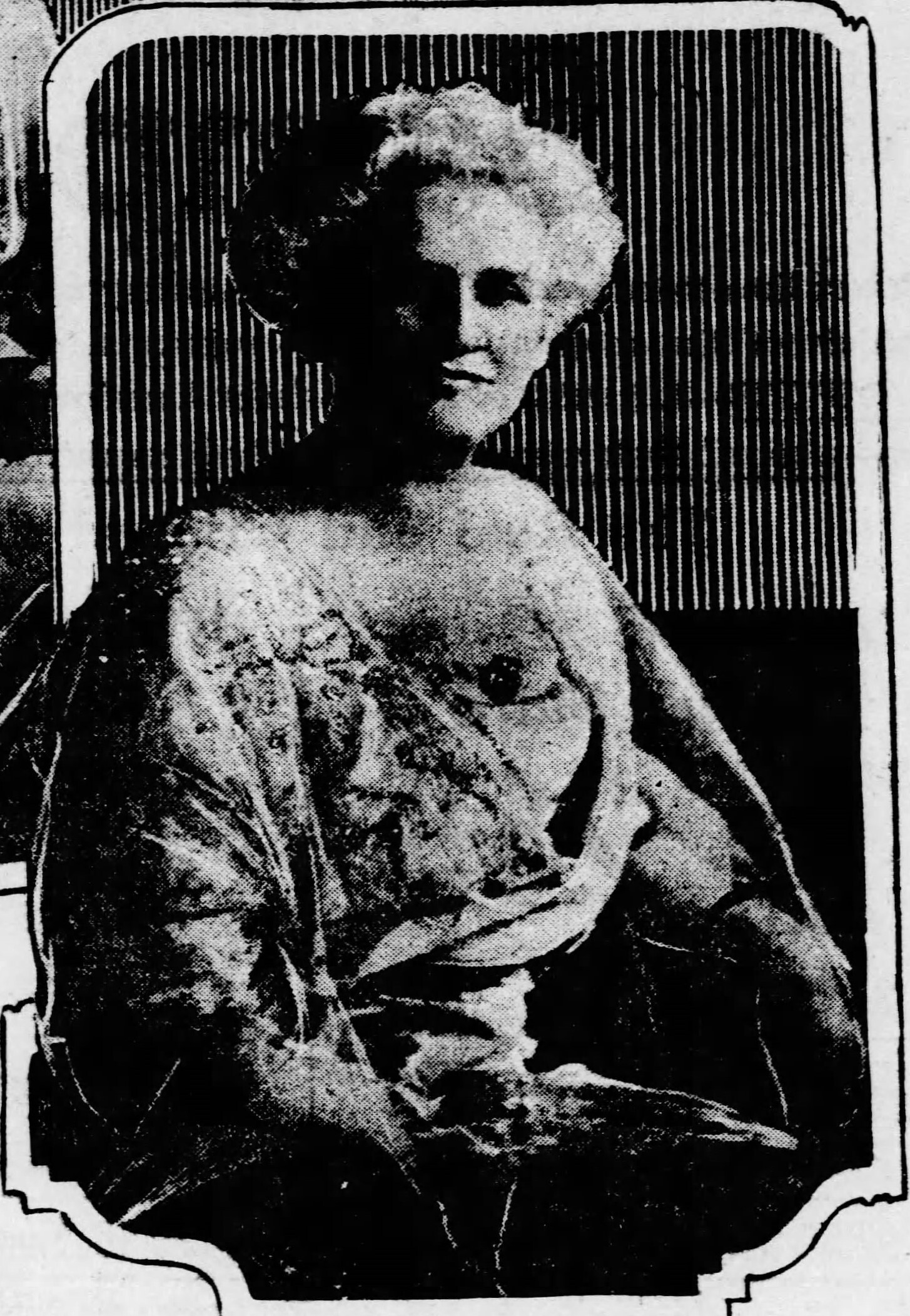
- Mrs. Julian Kennedy, 1917
- Born: Jane Eliza Breneman; November 24, 1852; Mahoning County, Ohio
- Died: February 7, 1930 (aged 77); St. Petersburg, Florida
- Other names: Jennie Breneman, Mrs. Julian Kennedy
- Occupations: Clubwoman and suffragist
- Spouse: Julian Kennedy
- Parent(s): Joseph Breneman and Elizabeth (Linn) Breneman

Jennie Eliza Kennedy (born Breneman November 24, 1852 - February 7, 1930) was an American clubwoman and suffragist. Kennedy was one of the activists that helped create the "Pittsburgh Plan" as a women's suffrage strategy.

== Biography ==
Born as Jane Eliza Breneman in Mahoning County, Ohio, Jennie E. Kennedy was a daughter of Joseph Breneman and Elizabeth (Linn) Breneman of Poland Township, Mahoning County.

She married Julian Kennedy in 1878. They were the parents of: Lucy B. Kennedy (1879–1962), a graduate of Vassar College who later married John O. Miller; Joseph Walker Kennedy (1884–1950), a graduate of Yale University who went into business with his father; Julian Kennedy (1886–1955); Eliza Jane Kennedy (1889–1964), a graduate of Vassar who later wed R. Templeton Smith, and Thomas Walker Kennedy (1894–1922), who studied at Cornell University. In 1922, her son Thomas died the day after Christmas in Schenectady, New York.

Kennedy was one of the founding members of the Equal Franchise Federation of Pittsburgh and hosted meetings in her home. Kennedy, along with Jennie Bradley Roessing, and Mary E. Bakewell created the "Pittsburgh Plan" for women's suffrage strategies in Pennsylvania. On May 2, 1914, she was the leader or "Boss of the Road" of the suffrage parade in Pittsburgh. This parade was considered "massive" and ended with a rally that included 30 speakers on women's suffrage. Kennedy also hosted Carrie Chapman Catt at her home when she visited Pittsburgh.

Her daughters, Lucy Kennedy Miller and Eliza Kennedy Smith, were also active members of the women's suffrage movement. By 1915, Lucy Miller had become president of the Equal Franchise Federation of Pittsburgh while Eliza had been appointed chair of the federation's membership committee.

== Death and legacy ==
Jennie E. Kennedy died in St. Petersburg, Florida, during a vacation on February 7, 1930. Her estate, which was valued at $200,000, was divided between her husband and children, according to newspaper accounts regarding the probating of her will.

== See also ==
- Women's suffrage in Pennsylvania
