= Mary "Molly" Ella Bakewell =

American suffragist and author (1868–1960)

Mary "Molly" Ella Bakewell (July 5, 1868 – 1960) was an American suffragist, author, and social activist from Pittsburgh, Pennsylvania. The eldest of three daughters in the prominent Bakewell glassmaking family, she devoted her life to advocacy and reform. Originally she was an advocate for kindergartens, as a member of the International Kindergarten Union. In the early 20th century she devoted herself to women's suffrage working with Eliza Kennedy Smith, Lucy Kennedy Miller, Jennie Bradley Roessing, Mary Flinn Lawrence, and Hannah Patterson. Later in life she attended Hartford Theological Seminary and took up the cause of female clergy. She also authored three books and an unpublished manuscript.

== Formative years ==
Mary Bakewell was born on July 5, 1868, in Allegheny City, Pennsylvania, to Benjamin Bakewell (1833–1897), Civil War veteran, glassmaker, director of Dollar Savings Bank, and Ellen Frances Boardman Bakewell (1845–1901). She was the eldest of three daughters, with younger sisters Euphemia (1870–1921) and Martha Harding Bakewell McKnight (1873–1966).

Her early reform efforts focused on promoting childhood education, specifically kindergartens. She was a member of the International Kindergarten Union and the Allegheny and Pittsburgh Free Kindergarten Association. Her first published work, Stories for Kindergartners and Kindchen, was published in 1901 and True Fairy Stories was published in 1902.

== Suffrage and women's rights activism ==
In her 40s, while living with her sister Euphemia in Sewickley, she became an active suffragist. She co-founded the Allegheny County Equal Rights Association, served as president of the Equal Franchise Federation of Western Pennsylvania, was a member of the Pennsylvania Women Suffrage Association, and was the Western district Vice President for the American Woman Suffrage Association. She also protested outside the White House with the Silent Sentinels, during Woodrow Wilson's presidency with Alice Paul.

She also worked with Lucy Kennedy Miller and Jennie Bradley Roessing to develop a plan for suffragist training known as the "Pittsburgh Plan" which offered classes on "practical politics" at the University of Pittsburgh. To draw attention to the cause, they organized major public events like a May 2, 1914, parade that marched from the Monongahela Wharf to Schenley Park. Notably unlike many suffrage activities elsewhere, this parade was integrated.

== Later life ==
In her 50s, she studied theology at the Hartford Theological Seminary with the goal of becoming an Episcopal minister. Though she struggled to find a church that would employ her because of her gender, she traveled and spoke in support of female clergy and eventually led a parish church in Wyoming. She also published several additional works including a fictional account of her time as a minister, What woman is here? The Autobiography of a Woman Pioneer in the Rural West (1949) and an autobiography Of Long Ago; The Children and the City (1949). Her personal papers, which include an unpublished monograph about the suffrage movement, Ourselves the Suffragettes, are housed at the Heinz History Center Archives. She died at the age of 92 in 1960 and is buried with her family in Allegheny Cemetery.
