= Louise Hall (suffragist) =

American suffragist and saleswoman

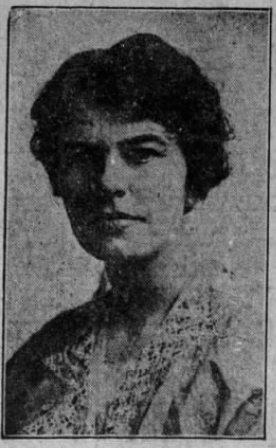
- Louise Hall, 1915
- Born: Annie Louise Hall; January 15, 1881; Pensacola, Florida Naval Base
- Died: September 20, 1966 (aged 85); Ojai, California
- Occupations: Suffragist, teacher, and saleswoman

Annie Louise Hall (January 15, 1881 - September 20, 1966) was an American suffragist and saleswoman. Hall worked as a teacher for many years, but after her experiences at a settlement house in New York City, she turned to suffrage work. Hall had experience working for women's suffrage in Connecticut, Massachusetts, New Hampshire, New York, Ohio, Pennsylvania, and Rhode Island. After her women's suffrage work, she went on to work as a saleswoman and eventually retired with her life partner to Ojai, California.

== Biography ==
Annie Louise Hall was born on January 15, 1881, in the Pensacola, Florida Naval Base. In 1884, her family moved to the Naval Base in Newport, Rhode Island and by 1900, the family was living in Lowell, Massachusetts. Hall graduated from Vassar in 1903. She worked as a teacher in Pennsylvania, Ohio, and New York. Hall worked for a year in a settlement house in New York City in the "Bohemian quarter" in 1908. While she worked at the settlement house, she began to become interested in women's suffrage. In 1910, she moved back to Lowell and worked as a secretary for a while.

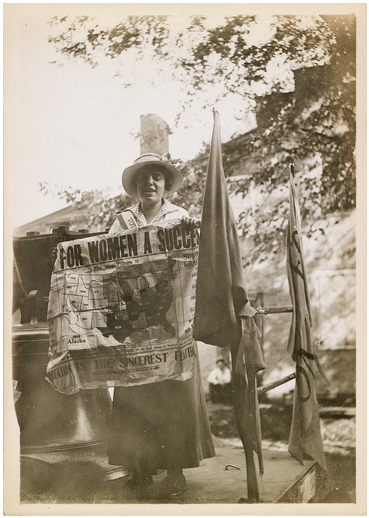
Louise Hall holding a women's suffrage banner in Pennsylvania, 1915

Hall's first suffrage work was in Massachusetts. Hall later worked on the Rhode Island women's suffrage campaign in Providence. In the summer of 1912, she was involved in campaigning on Ohio's women suffrage referendum. In Ohio, she was able to get Buffalo Bill to display a "Votes for Women" flag during one of his events. She spoke throughout Ohio in front of large audiences.

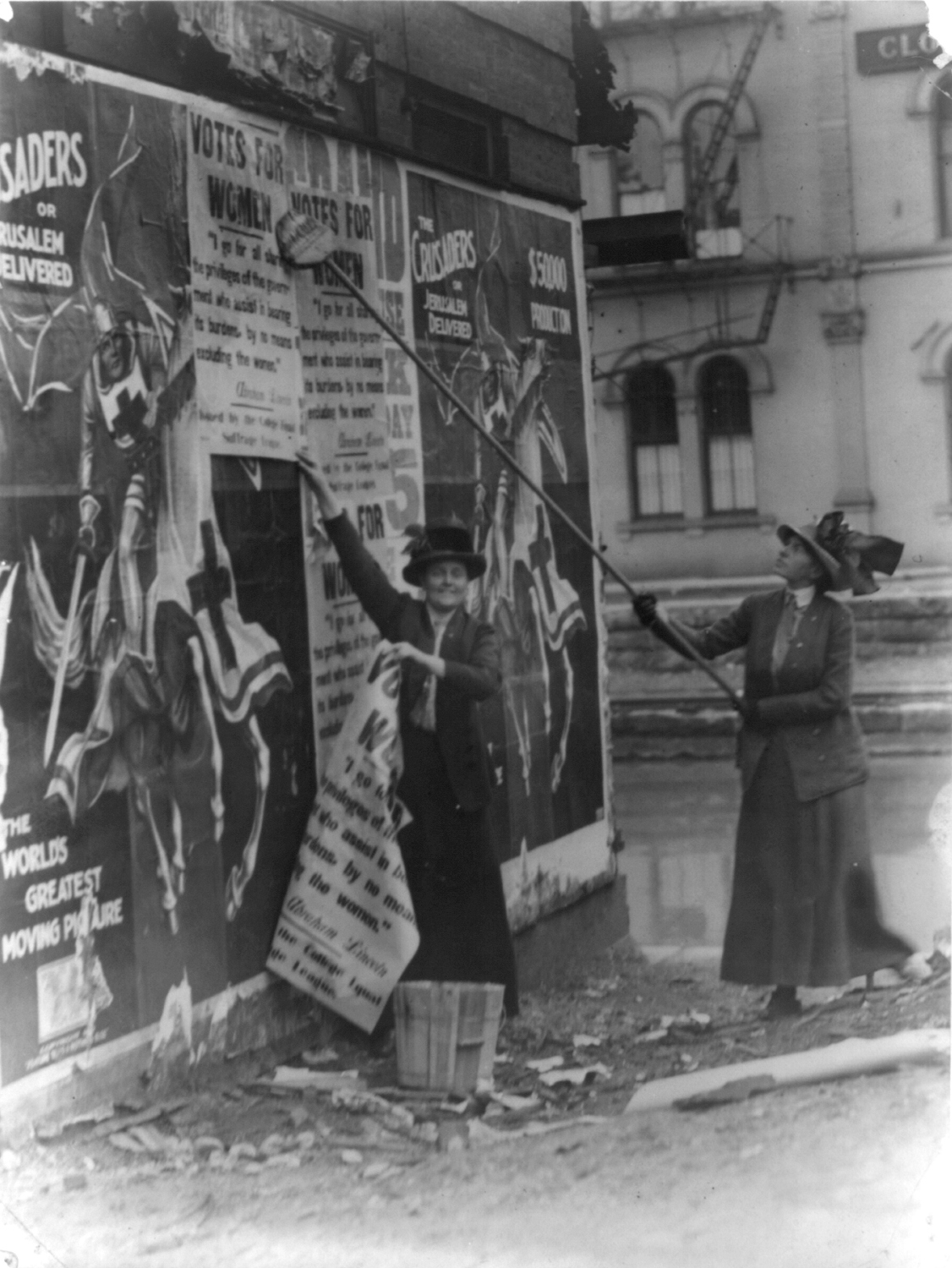
Susan Fitzgerald and Louise Hall bill posting in Cincinnati, 17 May 1912

Around 1913, she began to work on the Pennsylvania suffrage campaign. Hall worked as the field secretary for the Pennsylvania Woman's Suffrage Association (PWSA). When the Justice Bell toured Pennsylvania to promote women's suffrage in 1915, Hall served as the director of the tour and gave speeches throughout the state. Hall's life partner, Ethel Bret Harte, daughter of Bret Harte, toured with her during this time.

In 1917, Hall did work as field secretary for the New York Woman Suffrage Association (NYWSA). Hall worked briefly in Connecticut after a mostly successful New York campaign. Hall's last suffrage work was in New Hampshire, where she worked as an organizer 1918.

Hall went on to work as a saleswoman for Mass Mutual Life Insurance and moved back to Lowell. She and her partner, Harte, decided to move to Ojai, California in 1934. The two of them bought a car and drove across the United States to Ojai where they built a house. Afterwards, they divided their time between California and New England. Harte died in Ojai in 1964 and Hall died two years later in Ojai on September 20, 1966.
