= Julian Kennedy =

American engineer (1852–1932)

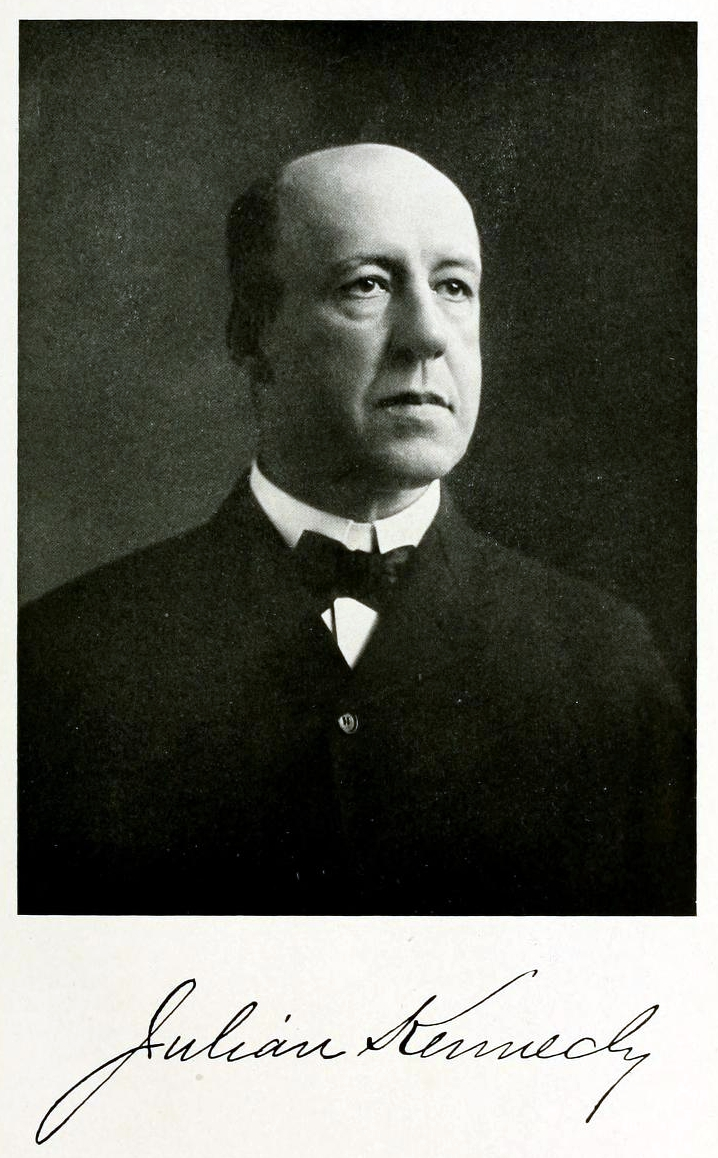
- Julian Kennedy, c. 1914
- Born: March 15, 1852; Poland, Ohio
- Died: May 28, 1932 (aged 80); Pittsburgh, Pennsylvania
- Burial place: Homewood Cemetery
- Occupations: Engineer and inventor
- Spouse: Jennie E. Kennedy
- Parent(s): Thomas Walker Kennedy and Margaret (Trusdale) Kennedy

Julian Kennedy (March 15, 1852 - May 28, 1932) was an American engineer and inventor, known for his national and international contributions to the steel industry. He was awarded the ASME Medal in 1928.

== Biography ==
Kennedy was born in Poland in 1852, the eldest of the seven sons of Thomas Walker Kennedy and Margaret (Trusdale) Kennedy. His father was a prominent constructive engineer, inventor, designer and builder of blast furnaces.

After the Poland Seminary, he attended the Sheffield Scientific School, where he obtained his Bachelor of Philosophy in 1875. Later in 1900 he further obtained his MSc degree, and in 1909 his PhD from the Stevens Institute of Technology.

Kennedy started his career Morse Bridge of Henry G. Morse and his brother Charles James Morse. Kennedy was superintendent for the company from 1879 to 1883. Afterwards he moved to the Carnegie Brothers and Company at Homestead, later Carnegie Brothers and Company, where he was General superintendent from 1885 to 1888.

For another two years he was chief engineer at Latrobe Steel Works in Ligonier, Pennsylvania, before settling as independent consulting engineer in 1890 in Pittsburgh. He consulted many of the major steel plants in the United States and Europe. As a steel consultant, Kennedy helped launch the Russian steel industry with the construction of the Nikopul' Providence Steel Mill in 1896. In 1907, Kennedy built the first Indian steel mill for Tata industries, which at the time, became the largest steel mill in the world, earning him the nickname, "Father of Asian Steel." As such, Kennedy was a major figure in the growth and success of steel in four of the World's top ten producers: India, USA, Russia, and Ukraine.

In 1904, Kennedy served as the president of the Pennsylvania women's suffrage group, the Allegheny County Equal Rights Association (ACERA).

== Personal life ==
Kennedy married Jennie E. Breneman in 1878 and the couple had several children who were popular in social circles in Pittsburgh. Jennie Kennedy was a clubwoman and a prominent suffragist in the Pittsburgh area. Their daughters, Lucy Kennedy Miller and Eliza Kennedy Smith, also both became prominent 20th-century American suffragists

Julian Kennedy died from a heart attack at his home in Pittsburgh on May 28, 1932. He was buried at Homewood Cemetery.

== Publications ==
- Julian Kennedy, "Some modifications in Blast Furnace Construction." Proceedings of the Engineers Society of Western Pennsylvania XXIII, Engineers Society, 1908. p. 3-15

Publications about Julian Kennedy

- Templeton Smith. Engineer Pittsburgh: The Story of Julian Kennedy, Engineer : His Helpmate Jane Eliza Brenneman and His Kennedy and Truesdale Ancestors in America. 1996.

Patents, a selection

- Patent US244997 - Hot Blast Stove, 1881.
- Patent US593476 - Furnace-valve for hot-blast stoves, 1896
- Patent US581165 - Mechanism for operating shears, 1897
- Patent US760873 - Hot-blast valve, 1904.
- Patent US1178522 - Charging-bell for blast-furnaces, 1916
