= Hannah M. Darlington =

American activist (1808–1890)

Hannah Darlington
- Born: Hannah Monaghan; October 29, 1808; Chatham, Pennsylvania, U.S.
- Died: November 17, 1890 (aged 82); West Chester, Pennsylvania
- Burial place: Longwood Cemetery
- Occupation: Activist

Hannah Monaghan Darlington (October 29, 1808 – November 17, 1890) was an American activist for women's suffrage, temperance, and the abolition of slavery. She organized the Pennsylvania Woman's Convention at West Chester in 1852. She and her husband were members of the Longwood Progressive Friends Meeting.

== Biography ==
Hannah was born Hannah Monaghan to parents James Monaghan and Hannah (Jackson) Monaghan at Chatham in Chester County, Pennsylvania, on October 29, 1808. Her father had been an Irish insurgent who fled to America after Robert Emmet's abortive uprisings. Her mother died young, so Hannah was raised by her grandfather, John Jackson, and her aunt, Lydia Jackson, who later married Enoch Lewis. In her teens, she taught school in Wilmington, Delaware, and on November 21, 1832, married Chandler Darlington, a brother of William Darlington. Like his wife, Chandler was an activist, and the couple's farmhouse, "The Pines," in Kennett Square continued to serve as a station on the Underground Railroad. (The Pines had been previously owned by Bartholomew Fussell, a physician and Underground Railroad stationmaster.) The Darlingtons hosted leading intellectuals such as John Greenleaf Whittier, James Russell Lowell, William Lloyd Garrison, and Theodore Parker. Bayard Taylor, a famous author, was a family friend and frequently asked her to read his poetry before publication. The Darlingtons were members of the Longwood Progressive Friends Meeting at Kennett Square.

Darlington is best known for organizing the Pennsylvania Woman's Convention at West Chester in 1852. Taking place only four years after the first women's rights convention in the United States, the West Chester convention attracted distinguished speakers such as Lucretia Mott, Frances D. Gage, and Ann Preston. Prior to 1852, Darlington had attended antislavery conventions and two national suffragist meetings in Worcester, Massachusetts. In 1854, Darlington served as co-secretary of the National Women's Rights Convention in Philadelphia. In addition, she championed temperance and played a role in enacting a Pennsylvania state law on April 14, 1855, which devolved liquor ordinances onto townships, though the law was repealed the following year.

After Chandler died in 1879, Hannah sold their house and retired to West Chester. In 1886, she donated the land on which the West Chester Public Library stands, and also donated the stained-glass windows on the library's west side, in memory of Bayard Taylor.

Darlington died at her West Chester home on November 17, 1890, at the age of 82. She was interred at Longwood Cemetery.
