= Votes for Women (speech) =

1901 speech by Mark Twain

Votes for Women, a popular slogan in the campaign for women's suffrage in the United States, was also the title of a January 20, 1901 speech by American author and humorist Samuel Langhorne Clemens, better known as Mark Twain. In this speech Twain spoke out for women's full enfranchisement in the electoral process and predicted that within 25 years, they would have the right to vote. This proved to be true, the Women's Suffrage Amendment to the Constitution being passed by the United States Congress in 1919 and ratified by all the states in 1920.

This speech was given at the Annual Meeting of the Hebrew Technical School for Girls in the Temple Emanuel.

== See also ==
- Declaration of Sentiments
- Ain't I a Woman?
- Address to the Women of America
