= Woman's Progress =

Women's rights journal (1893–1896)

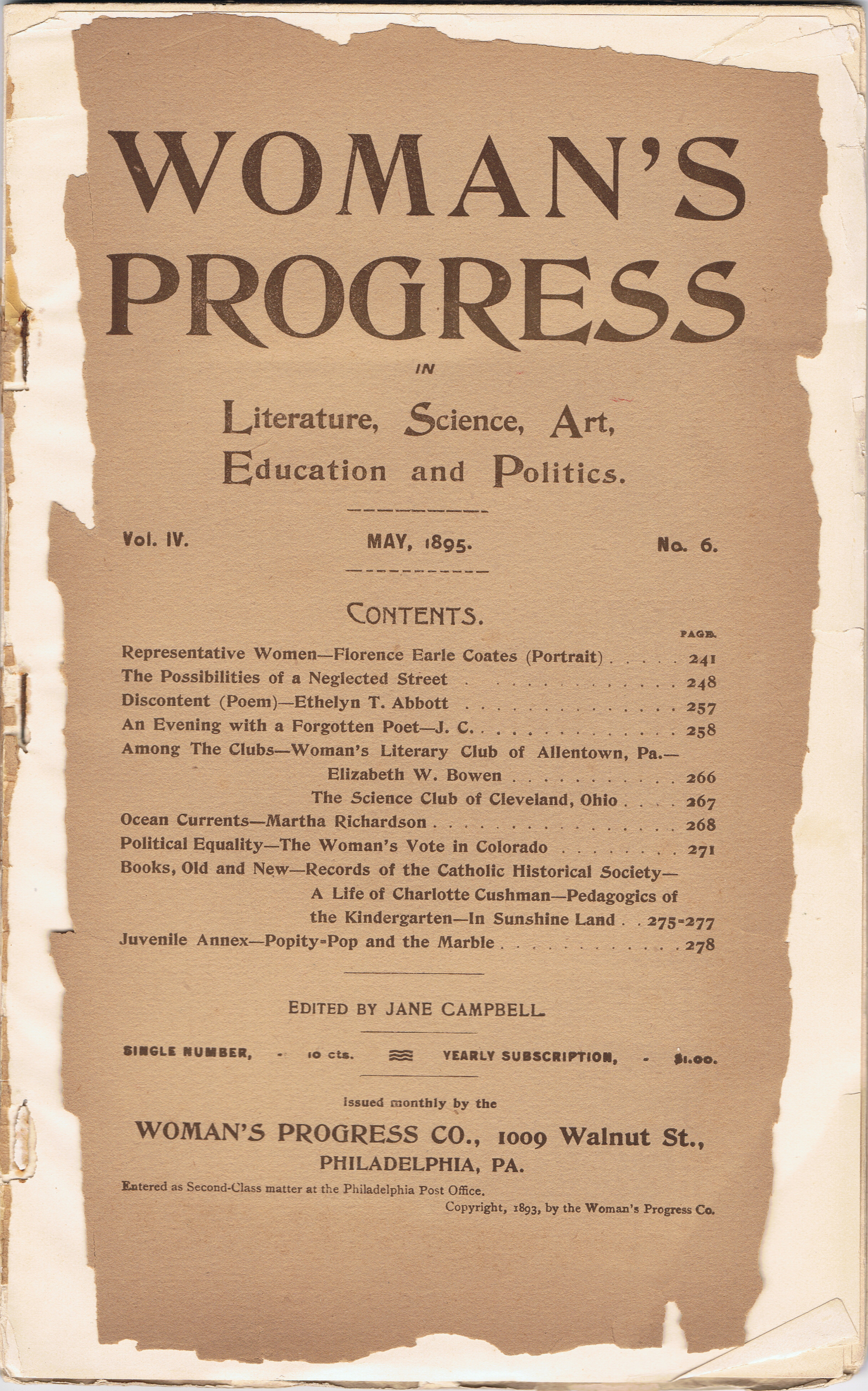
Woman's Progress May 1895

Woman's Progress in Literature, Science, Art, Education and Politics was a women's rights journal that was published from a Catholic women's perspective. The founders were sisters, Marianne and Jane Campbell.

The first issue came out in 1893 and was described by The Philadelphia Times as one that "while modest in form, gives an impression of earnestness and stability that should win the cordial recognition of Philadelphia women."

Published by the Progress Publishing Company in Philadelphia, Pennsylvania in the United States, this periodical ran until 1896.

== History ==
Woman's Progress was founded by Jane and Marianne Campbell in 1892. The journal ran until 1896.

The Campbell sisters wrote under the pseudonyms, "T.S. Arthur" and "Catherine Osborne". The first editions came out in 1893, were published by the Progress Publishing Company, which was located at 1009 Walnut Street in Philadelphia, and included contributions from Mary Grew, Elizabeth Powell Bond, and more. Grew was featured in the "Representative Women" columns that the periodical featured.

As Catholics, the Campbells often focused on Catholic women in the periodical, though the sister also featured non-Catholics working to achieve women's rights and other similar goals. The paper also supported women's suffrage. It tackled issues that were considered both progressive at the time and also gave time to conservative issues.

In May 1893, The Philadelphia Inquirer referenced one of the first Woman's Progress articles, signaling the early influence of the Campbell sisters' publication on the social consciences of their fellow journalists and other civic leaders. The Inquirer questioned "whether a movement to restore the names of the localities that have been lost in the city of Philadelphia is worth while [sic], and whether obliteration is to go any further," adding that "It might be said that Philadelphia was not founded by the Quakers, as our school histories declare, nor by the earlier Swedes, but by the Indians, who maintained a town on the site of Philadelphia long before the white man first came up the Delaware." The next month, the Inquirer stated the Campbell's publication "gathers in interest and strength with each number."

In November 1893, The Philadelphia Times praised Woman's Progress, noting that the publication was educating its readers about "more than the mere name of those of Philadelphia's daughters who are winning honor for their city," as it announced that the publication would be "entering its second year under very favorable conditions."
