= Justice Bell (Valley Forge) =

1915 replica of the Liberty Bell

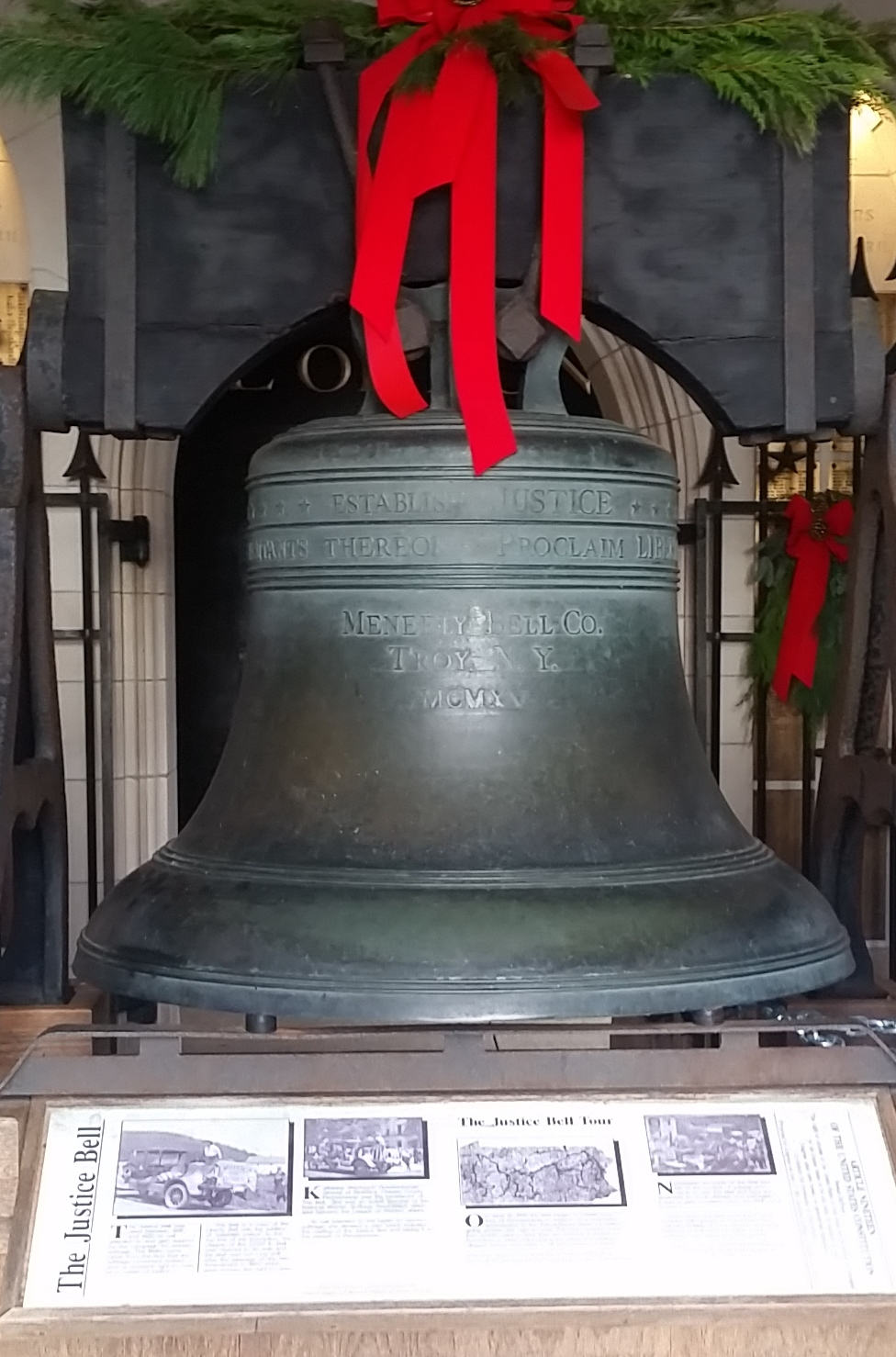
The Justice Bell (2016) (a.k.a. "The Women's Liberty Bell") at Washington Memorial Chapel in Valley Forge National Park.

The Justice Bell (The Women's Liberty Bell, also known as the Woman's Suffrage Bell) is a replica of the Liberty Bell made in 1915. It was created to promote the cause for women's suffrage in the United States from 1915 to 1920. The bell is on permanent display at the Washington Memorial Chapel in Valley Forge National Park in Pennsylvania.

== 1915: Casting and design ==
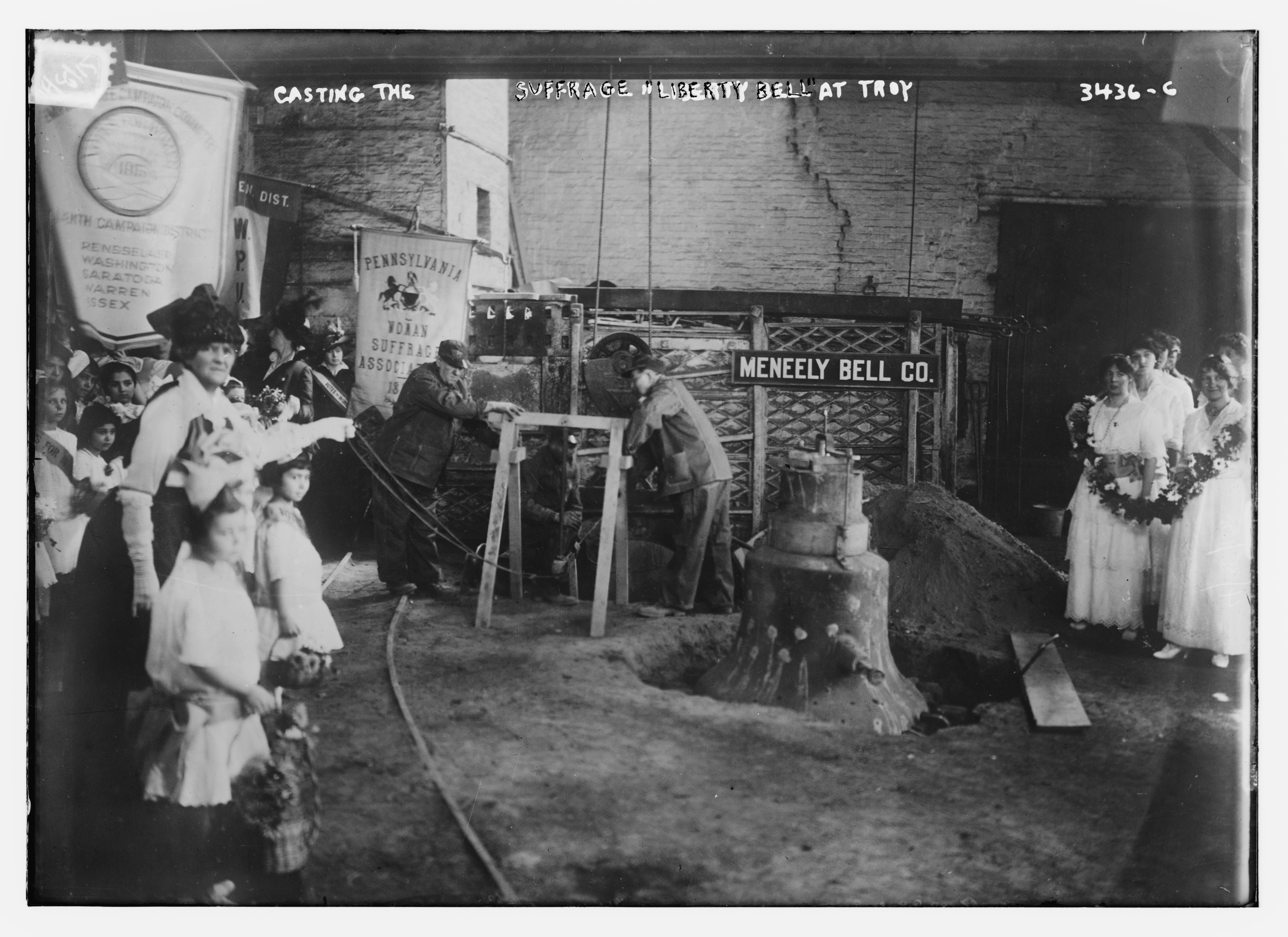
Casting the bell at Troy, NY.

The Justice Bell was commissioned by suffragist Katharine Wentworth Ruschenberger and was cast on March 31, 1915, by the Meneely Bell Foundry in Troy, New York and cost $2,000. The Justice Bell is a replica of the Liberty Bell, with a few minor design differences. The Justice Bell does not have a crack, and the words, "establish JUSTICE" were added on the top line of the inscription. Also, the Liberty Bell was cast in London, and the Justice Bell was cast in Troy, New York.

The inscription on the Justice Bell reads:

establish JUSTICE
Proclaim LIBERTY Throughout all the Land unto all the Inhabitants Thereof
Meneely Bell Co
Troy, NY
MCMXV

== 1915 – 1920: Suffrage awareness tours and the 19th Amendment ==
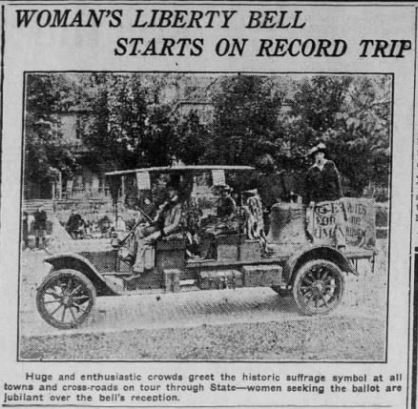
Woman's Liberty Bell Starts on Record Trip, headline from July 2, 1915

In an effort to raise awareness for women's suffrage, the bell went on a 5,000-mile tour in 1915, visiting all 67 Pennsylvania counties, on the bed of a modified pickup truck. The bell's clapper was chained to its side as a symbol of how women were being silenced by being unable to vote. The truck carried a sign with the slogan of the suffragist moment: "Votes for Women", a phrase coined by Mark Twain as the title of his famous speech in 1901.

Flyers stating the tour's mission were handed out to spectators. An excerpt reads:

The Woman's Liberty Bell - "Liberty throughout the land to all the inhabitants thereof" was the message of The Liberty Bell of 1776. It proclaimed the birth of a new nation "DEDICATED TO THE PROPOSITION THE GOVERNMENTS DERIVE THEIR POWER FROM THE CONSENT OF THE GOVERNED" AND THAT "TAXATION WITHOUT REPRESENTATION IS TYRNNY." Today, fifty million of these inhabitants are women ... The new bell is the Women's Liberty Bell, which is to ring for the first time on the day that the Women of Pennsylvania are granted the right to vote ...The Liberty bell 1776 rang to "Proclaim Liberty" to create our nation "The Woman's Liberty Bell" will ring to establish justice to complete our nation. Help break the chains that hold the bronze clapper silent Vote "Yes" on the Suffrage Amendment on Election Day Pennsylvania

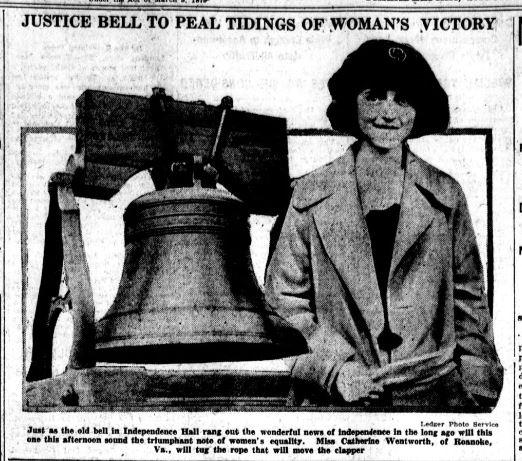
Justice Bell to Peal Tiding of Woman's Victory, Evening Public Ledger, September 25, 1920

Ruschenberger, Louise Hall, Ruza Wenclawska, and Pennsylvania Woman Suffrage Association leader Hannah J. Patterson were among the women to accompany the Justice Bell on its tour which kicked off in Sayre, Pennsylvania on June 23, 1915. Louise Hall served as the tour director. They were met by large crowds, marching bands, and parades everywhere they went. The reception was particularly notable in large cities such as New York City and Philadelphia. On October 22, 1915, the bell was welcomed to Philadelphia, joining in a parade of 8000 people, witnessed by a crowd of 100,000 people. Anna Howard Shaw's Yellow Suffrage automobile also appeared in the procession. The parade on Broad Street led to a ceremony held at the Academy of Music, which was attended by many dignitaries.

The bell also traveled to other states in 1920 to raise awareness for the 19th Amendment of the U.S. Constitution, which would give women the right to vote. The Justice Bell was taken to the first national convention of the Congressional Union for Woman Suffrage (National Women's Party) in Washington, D.C. It was also present at the national suffrage convention in Chicago.

The 19th Amendment was ratified on August 18, 1920. On September 25, 1920, the Justice Bell was honored at a celebration ceremony led by Katherine Wentworth Ruschenberger at Independence Square, on the south side of Independence Hall. Ruschenberger's niece, Katharine Wentworth, rang the bell for the very first time, releasing the clapper before a large crowd. Two of Susan B. Anthony's nieces were among the many dignitaries in attendance. The bell rang 48 times, once for every state in the union at that time.

== 1920 – 1994 ==
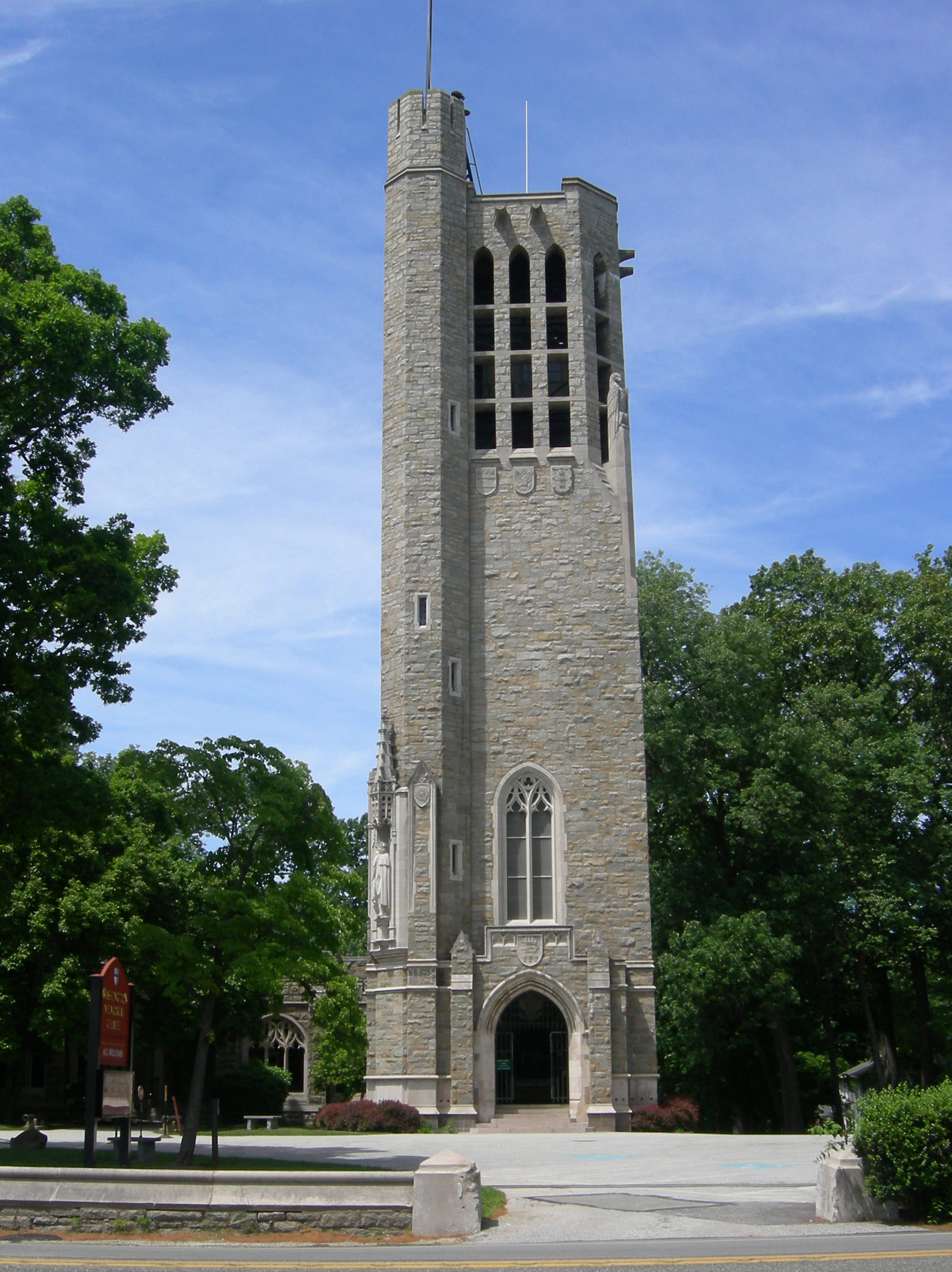
The National Patriots Bell Tower, the Justice Bell's home since 1943.

- In 1920, the Justice Bell was stored at Katherine Wentworth Ruschenberger's home.
- In 1943, per Katherine Wentworth Ruschenberger's will, after being denied a permanent installation on Independence Mall, the bell was moved and stored on the grounds of Valley Forge National Park.

== 1995 – present ==
75th Anniversary

- In April, 1995, in honor of the 75th anniversary of the League of Women Voters of Pennsylvania, the Justice Bell traveled for display in the rotunda of the Pennsylvania State Capitol building for a week and then at the State Museum of Pennsylvania, before embarking on a year-long tour of Pennsylvania.
- ln 1995, the Washington Memorial Chapel rector, Rev. Richard Lyon Stinson, had the bell moved into the rotunda chamber of the National Patriots Bell Tower.
- On August 22, 1996, after the tour of Pennsylvania, the Justice Bell returned to Washington Memorial Chapel for public exhibition.

100th Anniversary

- In 2015, in honor of the 100th anniversary of the Justice Bell, Independence National Historical Park unveiled an exhibit titled "Independence Hall & Votes for Women" in the Liberty Bell Center, located on Independence Mall in Philadelphia..
- On September 13, 2015, during a celebration of its 100th anniversary held at the Washington Memorial Chapel, the Justice Bell was ceremoniously rung and its clapper was symbolically unchained.

Centennial Celebration of the 19th Amendment

- In 2020, the bell returned to Independence Square for the centennial celebration of the 19th Amendment. During transport, the bell fell off the truck causing significant permanent damage. The platform, yoke, and carriage were destroyed in the fall and needed to be replaced. The bell's clapper was also damaged. Over the course of the next three years, the Justice Bell was rebuilt by the Verdin Bell Company, located in Cincinnati, OH.
- On August 26, 2020, the documentary, "Finding Justice: The Untold Story of Women's Fight for the Vote" premiered at the National Women's History Museum and later aired on aired on PBS. The nineteen minute long film explores the history of women's pursuit for the right to vote, focusing on the story of the Justice Bell, which became a prominent symbol of the suffrage movement.
- In August, 2023, The restored Justice Bell returned to its permanent location in the bell tower rotunda at the Washington Memorial Chapel.

== See also ==
- Freedom Bell, American Legion in Washington DC
- Liberty Bell
