= Daisy Elizabeth Adams Lampkin =

American suffragist and civil rights activist (1883–1965)

- Daisy E. Lampkin, from a 1936 magazine
- Born: Daisy Elizabeth Adams; August 9, 1883; Reading, Pennsylvania, U.S.
- Died: March 10, 1965 (aged 81)
- Occupations: Activist, suffragist, clubwoman
- Spouse: William Lampkin (m. 1912)

Daisy Elizabeth Adams Lampkin (August 9, 1883 – March 10, 1965) was an American suffragist, civil rights activist, organization executive, and community practitioner whose career spanned over half a century. Lampkin's effective skills as an orator, fundraiser, organizer, and political activist guided the work being conducted by the National Association of Colored Women (NACW); National Association for the Advancement of Colored People (NAACP); National Council of Negro Women and other leading civil rights organizations of the Progressive Era.

== Early life ==
Born on August 9, 1883, in Reading, Pennsylvania, Daisy Elizabeth Adams was educated in Reading, Pennsylvania. She was the daughter of George Adams, born in Virginia, and of Rose Proctor born in 1860 in Charles County, Maryland. Daisy's maternal grandparents were Joseph Jenifer Proctor and Elizabeth Swann, free persons of color.

After completing her formal education in the public school system, she relocated to Pittsburgh, Pennsylvania, in 1909. In 1912, she married William Lampkin, a restaurateur in the Pittsburgh suburbs. It was during this time that she developed her passion for social justice and civic engagement. Those issues that initially resonated with her were connected to her life as an African-American housewife. Motivated by the suffragette movement of the early 20th century, Lampkin began hosting local suffragist meetings at her home in 1912. After relocating within the city limits of Pittsburgh, Lampkin became increasingly involved in the local leadership of the suffragist movement. She joined the New Negro Women's Equal Franchise Federation, which would later be renamed the Lucy Stone League. Lampkin's early career as a suffragist included assembling street-corner speeches and organizing other black housewives to actively engage in consumer groups. In 1915, her leadership and oratorical ability earned her the position of president of the Lucy Stone League, a post she maintained until 1955.

It was also during this time that Lampkin became intimately involved with the national framework of the black women's club movement. Her leadership within the women's club movement introduced her to the leadership circles within the federation of women's clubs, particularly the National Association of Colored Women (NACW), where she would eventually serve as National Board Chairwoman. During this period she developed collegial friendships with black women's movement leaders such as Addie Waites Hunton, Mary Church Terrell and Charlotte Hawkins Brown. Still her most noted partnership would come through her association and friendship with Mary McLeod Bethune, with whom she would later assist in founding the National Council of Negro Women (NCNW) in 1935.

== Civil Rights Movement ==
Upon securing the right to vote, Lampkin became increasingly involved in civic engagement and civil rights advocacy effort on both the local and national level. She served as Chairwoman of the Allegheny County Negro Women's Republican League, vice-chairwoman of the Negro Voters League of Pennsylvania and vice-chairwoman of the Colored Voters Division of the Republican National Committee. She established the first Red Cross chapter among black women and organized local chapters of both the Urban League and NAACP in Pittsburgh. Most notably, she was made a stockholder and subsequently vice-president of the Pittsburgh Courier, which she used to raise funds for social justice causes and events. In her role as writer, editor, and executive, the paper became the top African-American-run circulating paper in the world during the 1950s. Lampkin's influence in national politics would eventually take her to the White House to meet with then President Calvin Coolidge and other noted black leaders regarding racial equality in 1924. Reflective of both the period and Lampkin's position, she was the only woman in attendance at the meeting.

== Field Secretary of the NAACP ==
These efforts would eventually lead to the national secretary of the NAACP, Walter White recruiting Lampkin as the first field secretary for the organization in 1930. Here Lampkin's efforts to organize and bolster the image of the NAACP nationally have become legendary. In 1931, Lampkin single-handedly organized the NAACP's 1931 National Convention in Pittsburgh. Her fundraising and organizing skills so impressed NAACP leadership that in 1935, she was moved from regional to National Field Secretary of the organization. That same year, while continuing to establish local NAACP chapters and participating in fundraising efforts, Lampkin along with White, spearheaded the organization's drive to pass a federal anti-lynching bill in the United States Congress. Lampkin's direct involvement within the lobbying efforts on behalf of the bill far surpassed her collection of the $9,378 that she grossed through the button campaign during the Great Depression. In her description of opposition to the federal bill by white southern anti-lynching activist, Jessie Daniel Ames, because of its anti-states’ rights stance, notes: "Black women thoroughly disgusted by Ames's stance, called a meeting with her and some of her supporters, in Atlanta in 1935. Daisy Lampkin who had been involved with the confrontation with the National Woman's Party and who was now a field secretary for the NAACP, began the discussion. The silence of the Association of Southern Women for the Prevention of Lynching (ASWPL), she said, was strengthening the position of congressional opponents of the bill. They "[would] take new courage and they [would] use it to their advantage when they can stand on the floor and say that the...southern white women did not endorse the Costigan-Wagner Bill." While other black leaders such as Nannie Helen Burroughs and Mary Bethune proved to be more conciliatory in their understanding of southern white women's opposition to the anti-lynching law, Lampkin continued to decry the lack of support amongst her supposed white peers. Such insistence garnered Lampkin the image of the no-nonsense community activist that she was most known for during the era.

== Legacy ==
In addition to her lobbying, organizing and fundraising efforts, Lampkin has also been credited with recruiting a young Baltimore attorney and future Supreme Court Justice, Thurgood Marshall to become a member of the NAACP's Legal Defense Committee in 1938. Marshall would go on to lead the organization in its successful litigation in Brown vs. Board of Education of Topeka before the U.S. Supreme Court. She was credited with having the most substantial gains in membership among any of the organization's executive leadership. During her last year as National Field Secretary she raised over $1 million for the organizations. So dedicated was she to the NAACP and community organizing that has been said she to have crossed the country conducting 40 NAACP chapter meetings in one month. Lampkin would eventually take on a renewed interest in black women's organizing; assisting the Delta Sigma Theta sorority with internal fundraising and the centralizing of its finances and records. She has been credited with advancing the organization's ability to have a presence in the policy-making center of the nation. She was inducted as an Honorary Member in 1947.

== Death ==
While she resigned as national field secretary in 1947, Lampkin continued to serve on the organization's executive board. She suffered a stroke while at an NAACP membership drive in Camden, New Jersey, and died on March 10, 1965. A Pennsylvania State Historical Marker is Placed at 2519 Webster Ave., Pittsburgh, Pennsylvania commemorating her accomplishments. Her grave is at Homewood Cemetery, Pittsburgh.

== See also ==
- List of suffragists and suffragettes
- Timeline of women's suffrage

== Sources ==
- Axinn, J., &. Mark J. Stern (2008). Social Welfare: A history of the American response to need. Boston: Allyn and Bacon.
- Giddings, P. (1988). In Search of Sisterhood: Delta Sigma Theta and the challenge of the black sorority movement. New York: HarperCollins.
- Giddings, P. (1984). When and Where I Enter: The impact of black women on race and sex in America. New York: HarperCollins.
- "Daisy Lampkin. (2006, January 31)". Answer.com.
- Hine, D. H. (2006). The African American Odyssey, 3rd edn. Upper Saddle River: Pearson Education, Inc.
- Houck, D. W. (2009). Women and the Civil Rights Rovement, 1954–1965. Oxford: University Press of Mississippi.
- Levin, Steve (1998, February 2). "Daisy Lampkin was a dynamo for change". Pittsburgh Post-Gazette.
- White, D. (1999). Too Heavy a Load: Black women in defense of themselves 1894–1994. New York: Norton.
