= Euphemia Bakewell =

American bookbinder (1870–1921)

- Born: January 30, 1870; Pittsburgh, Pennsylvania, U.S.
- Died: December 25, 1921 (aged 51)
- Occupation: Bookbinder

Euphemia Bakewell (January 30, 1870 – December 25, 1921) was an American bookbinder.

== Biography ==
She was born in Pittsburgh, Pennsylvania, on January 30, 1870, to Benjamin Bakewell (an executive with Bakewell, Pears & Co.) and Ellen Frances Boardman (daughter of Rev. Henry Augustus Boardman). She was often known to her family as "Effie" or "Miss Ef".

She studied at the Pittsburgh School of Design, and then under William Merritt Chase on Long Island. While in New York, she met Mary Helen Wingate Lloyd, who remained a lifelong friend. Bakewell spent time in Europe, where she studied painting in Paris at the Académie Julian. In 1902, she studied under T. J. Cobden-Sanderson at his Doves Bindery, and continued her study of bookbinding back in Paris. Upon her return to the United States the following year, she lived with her sister Mary in the Sewickley neighborhood of Pittsburgh, where she established her own bindery. In Pittsburgh, she taught Rachel McMasters Miller Hunt (and, briefly, a group of Hunt's friends). Due to a detached retina, she was forced to bring her bookbinding activities to a close. Throughout her life, she maintained close ties to both the American and European bookbinding communities.

During the First World War, Bakewell travelled to Europe to assist with relief efforts. With funding from her friend Rachel McMasters Miller Hunt and her husband Roy A. Hunt, Bakewell worked to help orphans and child refugees. In September 1918, she travelled to France with the YMCA's Educational Department to teach, read to, and give lectures to soldiers. She returned to the United States 1919.

She died of pernicious anemia on December 25, 1921.
