= Pennsylvania Woman's Convention at West Chester in 1852 =

Women's rights convention

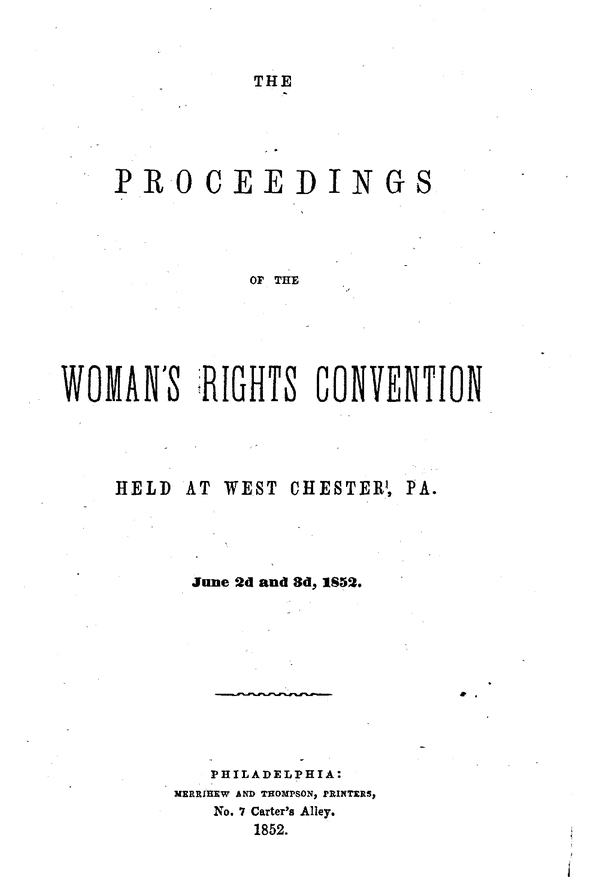
The Proceedings of the Woman's Rights Convention Held at West Chester, Pennsylvania, 1852

The Pennsylvania Woman's Convention at West Chester in 1852 was held in West Chester, Pennsylvania, on June 2 and 3. The convention drew women's rights activists from around the United States. The convention discussed issues such as women's suffrage, equal pay, and equal access to education. Participants also addressed legal issues facing women. It was the first woman's rights convention held in Pennsylvania.

== History ==
The call for the convention was described in the Lancaster Examiner on May 12, 1852, inviting "friends of justice and equal rights, to consider and discuss the present position of woman in society, her natural rights and relative duties." The original call was signed by Lucretia Mott, Sallie P. Lewis, and "sundry other fair revolutionists." It was to be held in Horticultural Hall (now the Chester County History Center) in West Chester, Pennsylvania on June 2–3, 1852. Jacob Painter, a Quaker from Delaware County, suggested the location and the meeting was organized by Hannah M. Darlington. Darlington was an experienced organizer and an abolitionist.

It was the first women's rights convention held in Pennsylvania and was well-attended. On Wednesday, June 2, the convention was called to order at 10 am by Lucretia Mott. Mott later discussed women's suffrage efforts that had taken place since the 1848 Seneca Falls Convention. Later, they named the officers of the convention, with Mary Ann W. Johnson sitting as president. By the end of the morning session, the convention had resolved:

"That women are entitled by natural right to equal participation with men in the political institutions required for the protection of the whole people; and that it is a gross inconsistency, and glaring exercise of arbitrary power, to compel women to pay taxes, while they are not permitted a voice in deciding the amount of those taxes, or the purposes to which they shall be applied."

During the afternoon session on June 2, the convention also resolved that women should have equality before the law and that the exercise of women's participation in politics would not "involve the sacrifice of the refinement or sensibilities of true womanhood." They also discussed and resolved that women should have equality in medical education.

The next day, the convention met at 9 am. Ann Preston gave an address on the disparity in the treatment of women, including the fact that women were not legal guardians of their own children, and that women were turned away from equal employment opportunities. During the morning session, the convention resolved that women should have "equal station among their brethren," that it was good to advocate for the improvement of women's status in society, and that women should be free to study what they wish. The afternoon session passed further resolutions which repudiated tax paying for universities which women could not attend, and which insisted that wives should have equal control over her property, women should have rights as legal guardians, and there should be equal pay for women. All of the resolutions of the convention were similar to those declared at the Seneca Falls Convention.

== Notable attendees ==
- Frances Dana Barker Gage
- Harriot Kezia Hunt
- Isaac Mendenhall
- James Mott
- Lucretia Mott
- Ann Preston
- Evan Pugh
- Ernestine Rose

== See also ==
- Seneca Falls Convention
- Ohio Women's Convention at Salem in 1850
- National Women's Rights Convention
- Women's suffrage in Pennsylvania
