= Hannah J. Patterson =

American suffragist

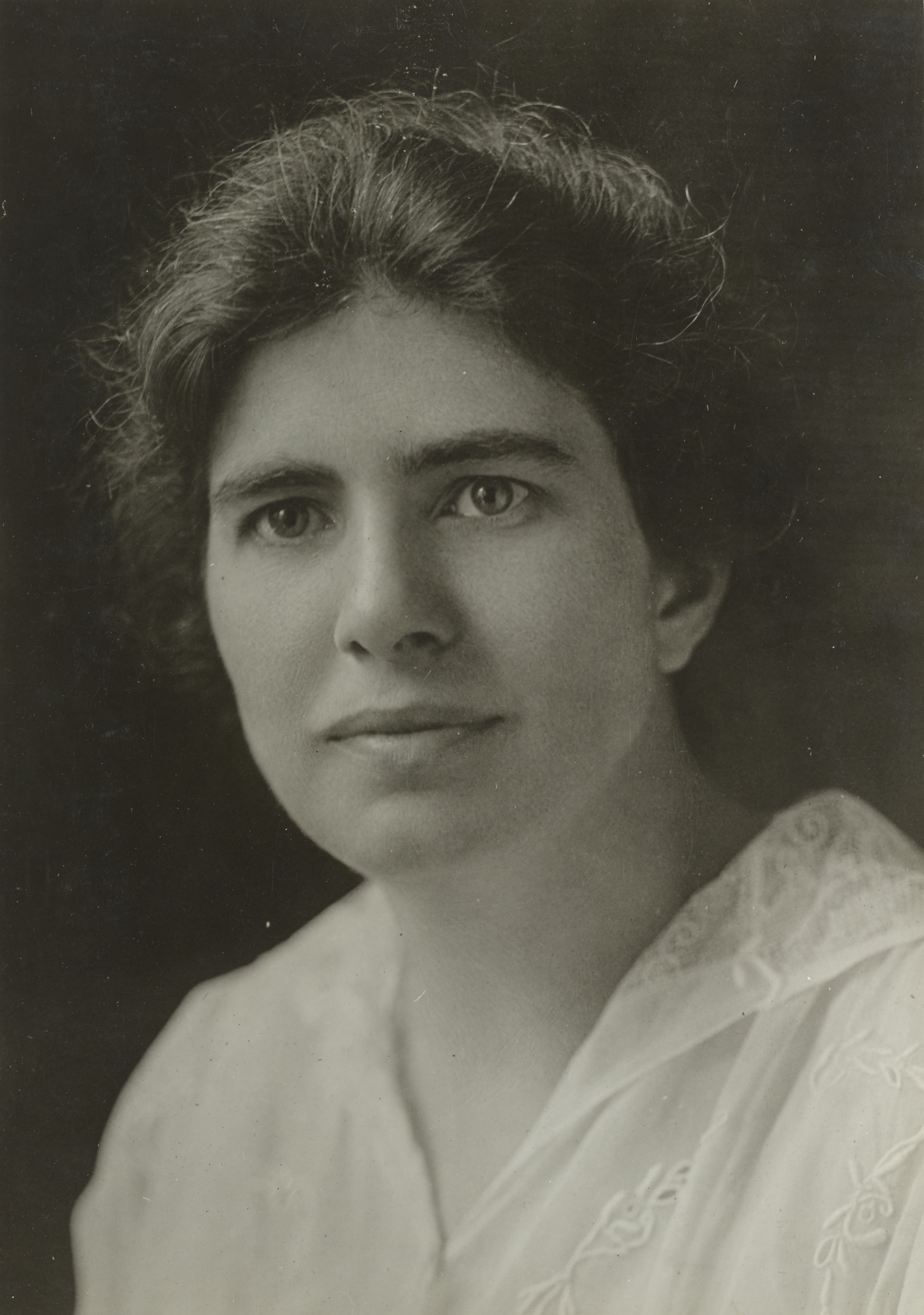
- Patterson in 1918
- Born: Hannah Jane Patterson; November 5, 1879; Smithton, Pennsylvania, US
- Died: August 21, 1937 (aged 57); Pittsburgh, Pennsylvania, US
- Education: Wilson College (A.B.); Columbia University; University of Pennsylvania
- Occupation: Suffragist
- Awards: Distinguished Service Medal

Hannah Jane Patterson (November 5, 1879 – August 21, 1937) was an American suffragist and social activist. She was a key member of the women's suffrage movement in Pennsylvania and worked for the National American Woman Suffrage Association. During World War I Patterson was a member of the Woman's Committee of the Council of National Defense. For her service, she was awarded with a Distinguished Service Medal. Patterson graduated from Wilson College and studied at both Columbia University and the University of Pennsylvania.

== Early life and education ==
Hannah Jane Patterson was born on November 5, 1879, in Smithton, Pennsylvania, to Harriet McCune and John Gilfillan Patterson, a banker. In 1897, she began her studies at Wilson College in Chambersburg. Initially homesick, Patterson participated in baseball, field hockey, tennis, and basketball. She was on the debate team and served as class president. She earned her A.B., graduating in 1901.

Patterson then attended Columbia University in 1902, taking courses in finance, and the University of Pennsylvania, where she studied law.

== Career and social activism ==
An educated woman in the Progressive Era, Patterson involved herself in organizations pushing for reform of child labor laws, women's rights, and public health laws.

Following a move to Pittsburgh, Patterson became a member of the Civic Club of Allegheny County. Her efforts were instrumental in the creation of a juvenile court for the county. She founded the Allegheny County Equal Rights Association in 1904 alongside Jennie Bradley Roessing, Mary Bakewell, Mary Flinn, and Lucy and Eliza Kennedy. Their organization's "Pittsburgh Plan" called for the creation of "local and regional associations at the political precinct level" and was later adopted on a national scale by the National American Woman Suffrage Association (NAWSA).

Patterson also worked with the Allegheny County Committee on School Legislation and was involved with the Consumers' League of Western Pennsylvania. She was a long-time supporter of Wilson College. The Alumnae Association elected her as treasurer of in 1906. Patterson later became president of the association and one of the college's trustees.

=== Women's suffrage ===
By 1910, Patterson was campaigning for women's suffrage. She was a key member of the Pennsylvania suffrage movement, serving as vice president of the Pennsylvania Woman Suffrage Association (PWSA) and the first person to chair Pennsylvania's Woman Suffrage Party, a position she held until 1915.

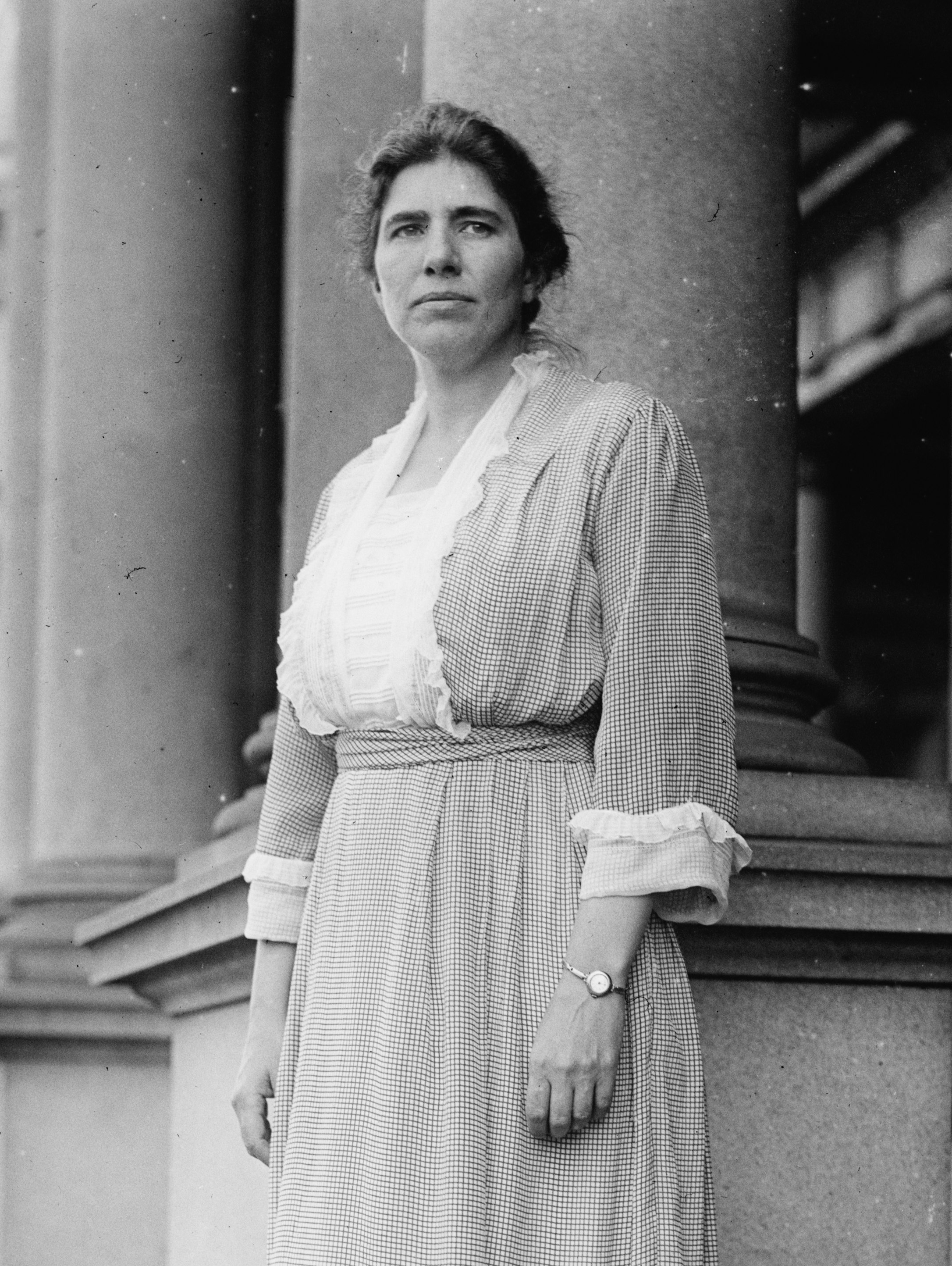
Patterson standing in front of the State, War, and Navy Building in Washington, D.C., 1919

In November 1914, Patterson gave a speech before the 46th annual convention of the Pennsylvania Woman Suffrage Association in Scranton. Philadelphia's Evening Ledger called her "one of the most convincing speakers for the cause."

"Manmade laws down the ages have been framed to protect property, including woman herself as a chattel; the modern woman wants them framed to protect life, to protect children in the schools and from factories, to raise the age of consent, to give us food free from adulteration… The great importance of this question lies in the fact that, deprived of the vote, women are cut off from the most important field of human activity."

— Patterson, speaking at the Pennsylvania Woman Suffrage Association convention

Alongside PWSA president Roessing, Patterson led the 1915 drive to amend the Pennsylvania Constitution to allow universal suffrage. They mounted an intensive lobbying campaign, attending public events and giving lectures throughout the state. The PWSA commissioned the casting of the Justice Bell, a replica of the Liberty Bell with its clapper chained to its side as a symbol of how women were being silenced by being denied the vote. Patterson participated in the bell's tour, which took it to every county in Pennsylvania. On July 7, 1915, at a "Suffrage Day" themed baseball game between the Phillies and the Giants, Patterson threw out the first pitch. While the suffrage amendment was narrowly defeated, their efforts spurred the major political parties to include suffrage planks in their 1916 political platforms.

Patterson then moved to New York City and was elected to be corresponding secretary for NAWSA in 1916.

== World War I ==
Following the April 1917 American entry into World War I, Patterson was appointed to the Woman's Committee of the Council of National Defense. The Committee elected her Resident Director of the executive office. She oversaw the 15 woman outfit, working out of a building in Washington, D.C., known as "The Little Playhouse". The following year she was appointed Associate Director of the newly created Field Division of the Council of National Defense and was made a member of its governing board. In her role as Resident Director of the Woman's Committee, Patterson was responsible for the performance of each of the committee's departments. The Committee coordinated the actions of state divisions in conjunction with the larger war effort and served as an intermediary between the federal government and women's groups of the 48 states.

The President of the United States of America, authorized by Act of Congress, July 9, 1918, takes pleasure in presenting the Army Distinguished Service Medal to Hannah J. Patterson, a United States Civilian, for exceptionally meritorious and distinguished services to the Government of the United States, in a duty of great responsibility during World War I. Hannah Paterson devoted herself through the whole period of the war to executive work of the Women's Committee of the Council of National Defense, devoting herself with great ability and energy to the organization of the activities and interests of the women throughout the United States in the interest of the successful prosecution of the war and, by her efforts, contributed to the splendid cooperation on the part of the women of the country in the great national emergency.

— War Department, General Orders No. 73 (1919)

For her wartime service, Patterson received the Army's Distinguished Service Medal in 1919. She was one of the first woman civilians to receive the award, then the highest non-combat award presented by the United States government.

Following the war, she was appointed assistant to Newton D. Baker, President Woodrow Wilson's Secretary of War. Patterson later served on the War Risk Advisory Committee alongside future Chief Justice Charles Evans Hughes.

== Return to Pennsylvania ==
After the war, Patterson returned to Pittsburgh and was an investment advisor, heading the women's department of brokerage firm J. H. Holmes & Co. in the 1920s. She also served on the board of directors of the West Newton bank her father ran.

In 1931, Patterson managed her friend Sara Soffel's successful campaign for judgeship, helping her become Pennsylvania's first woman jurist. She was asked but declined to be a candidate for Congress in 1935.

Patterson died on August 21, 1937, at West Penn Hospital in Pittsburgh. She is interred at West Newton Cemetery. Patterson never married and she had no children.
