= Jennie Bradley Roessing =

American women's suffragist (1881–1963)

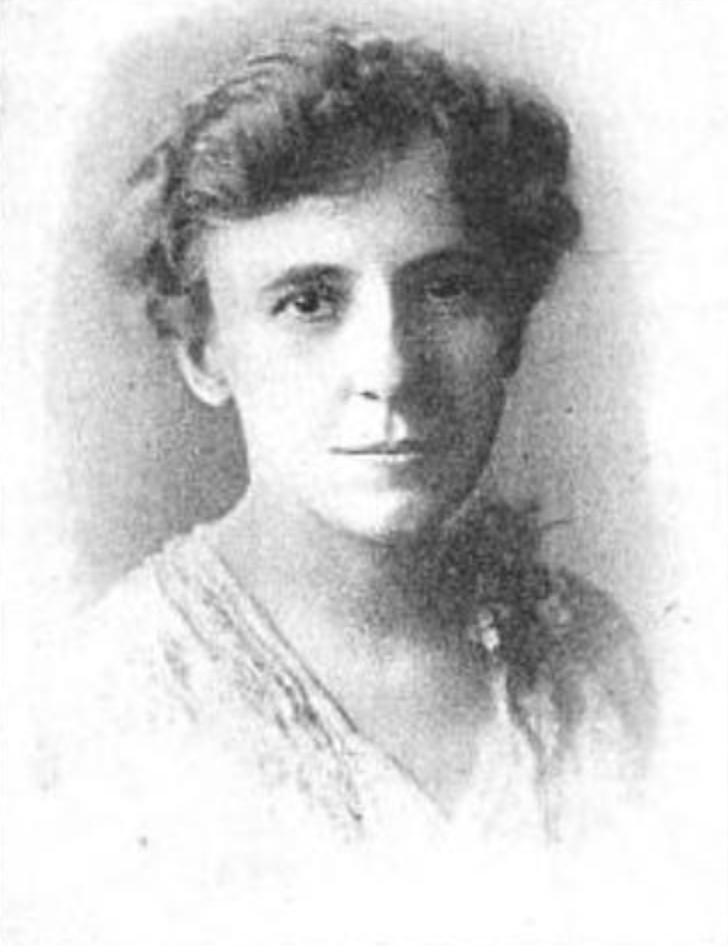
- Roessing in 1917
- Born: May 11, 1881; Pittsburgh, Pennsylvania
- Died: May 15, 1963 (aged 82)
- Known for: Women's rights activist
- Movement: Women's Suffrage
- Spouse: Frank M. Roessing (divorced)

Jennie Bradley Roessing (May 11, 1881 – May 15, 1963) was a leader in Pennsylvania's women's suffrage movement during the early 1900s. She was an active participant in the women's suffrage movement and various Pittsburgh-area organizations.

== Early life ==
Roessing was born on May 11, 1881, in Pittsburgh, Pennsylvania, to John Bradley and Anna Marie (Friedrich) Bradley. John was a successful tailor. Jennie married and later divorced Frank M. Roessing, a civil engineer. Jennie Bradley Roessing died in Pittsburgh on May 15, 1963.

== Career ==
In 1914, Roessing began her campaign for the rights of women. She worked with Hannah Patterson, Mary Flinn, Lucy Kennedy, and Mary Bakewell. Together they formed the Allegheny County Equal Rights Association (ACERA). ACERA changed its title in 1910 to The Equal Rights Franchise Federation of Western Pennsylvania. Roessing was vice-president. In 1912, she was also involved at the state level as president of the Pennsylvania Woman Suffrage Association (PWSA). She and others travelled throughout Pennsylvania giving speeches and lobbying the Pennsylvania legislature to pass a woman suffrage bill. This included a four month tour with the Liberty Bell of Suffrage. The bill did not pass. She continued her lobbying efforts. Roessing became chairwoman of the National American Woman Suffrage Association afterwards.

In 1920 women were given the right to vote. Roessing was active in other organizations in the Pittsburgh area. These included: the English Speaking Union, the First Unitarian Church of Pittsburgh, the Audubon Society, the Twentieth Century Club (a literary organization founded in 1901), treasurer of Pittsburgh Play Grounds, Vacation Schools, and Recreation Parks.

== Jennie Bradley Roessing Collection ==
The Jennie Bradley Roessing collection, housed in the Archives Service Center, University of Pittsburgh, consists of documents, pamphlets, speeches, correspondence, personal papers, photographs, and memorabilia.
