= Swanee River (1939 film) =

1939 film by Sidney Lanfield

- Directed by: Sidney Lanfield
- Written by: John Taintor Foote; Philip Dunne
- Produced by: Darryl F. Zanuck
- Starring: Don Ameche; Andrea Leeds; Al Jolson; Felix Bressart
- Cinematography: Bert Glennon
- Edited by: Louis R. Loeffler
- Music by: Robert Russell Bennett (uncredited); David Buttolph (uncredited); Cyril J. Mockridge (uncredited); Rudy Schrager (uncredited)
- Production company: 20th Century-Fox
- Distributed by: 20th Century-Fox
- Release date: December 30, 1939 (United States)
- Running time: 84 minutes
- Language: English

Swanee River is a 1939 American biographical musical drama film directed by Sidney Lanfield and starring Don Ameche, Andrea Leeds, Al Jolson, and Felix Bressart. It is a biopic about Stephen Foster, a songwriter from Pittsburgh who falls in love with the South, marries a Southern girl, then is accused of sympathizing when the Civil War breaks out. Typical of 20th Century-Fox biographical films of the time, the film was more fictional than it was factual.

== Plot ==
The family of Stephen Foster (Ameche) insists that he accept a seven-dollar-a-week shipping clerk job in Cincinnati, but he prefers to write songs. Stephen's prospective father-in-law Andrew McDowell has no faith in Stephen, who wants to write "music from the heart of the simple people of the South." The struggling composer is content to sell "Oh! Susanna" for fifteen dollars to minstrel singer E. P. Christy and allows Christy to take credit as its writer.

Soon, the song is sweeping the country, and Stephen follows it with "De Camptown Races" and goes on tour with Christy's troupe, called Christy's Minstrels. Solvent at last, Stephen marries Jane McDowell (Leeds), and a daughter Marion is born to them. Inspired by his wife's beauty, Stephen writes "Jeanie with the Light Brown Hair".

However, Stephen's prosperity ends when his classical music fails and the advent of the Civil War brands his music as traitorous. When he turns to drinking, Jane leaves him, but two years later she returns to encourage him to write "Old Folks at Home." Stephen never hears the composition performed, however, for on the night that Christy presents the song to a New York audience, the composer dies of a heart attack.

== Cast ==
- Don Ameche as Stephen Foster
- Andrea Leeds as Jane McDowell Foster Wiley
- Al Jolson as Edwin Pearce Christy
- Felix Bressart as Henry Kleber
- Chick Chandler as Bones
- Russell Hicks as Andrew McDowell
- George H. Reed as Old Joe, McDowell's Coachman
- Richard Clarke as Tom Harper
- Diane Fisher as Marion Foster
- George P. Breakston as Ambrose
- Al Herman as Tambo
- Charles Trowbridge as Mr. Foster
- George Meeker as Henry Foster
- Leona Roberts as Mrs. Foster
- Charles Tannen as Morrison Foster
- Clara Blandick as Mrs. Griffin
- Nella Walker as Mrs. McDowell
- Harry Hayden as Erwin
- Esther Dale as Temperance Woman
- Harry Tenbrook as Jim (uncredited)
- John Hamilton as doctor at Foster's deathbed (uncredited)
- Robert Emmett Keane as agitator in cafe' (uncredited)
- Mae Marsh as Mrs. Jonathan Fry (uncredited)
- Matthew Beard as extra (uncredited)

== Background ==
According to a news item in Hollywood Reporter, David O. Selznick was interested in working on this film. Material contained in the Twentieth Century-Fox Produced Scripts Collection at the UCLA Theater Arts Library adds that Richard Sherman worked on a treatment, but his participation in the final film has not been confirmed. In story conferences, Darryl F. Zanuck suggested Nancy Kelly for the role of Jane and Al Shean for Kleber. Twentieth Century-Fox publicity materials at the AMPAS Library note that some sequences were shot along the Sacramento River. Studio publicity also adds that Don Ameche learned to dance the soft shoe and play the violin for his role in this film. A news item in Hollywood Reporter adds that Andrea Leeds was borrowed from Samuel Goldwyn to make this picture.

There was an earlier screen biography of Foster only four years before this one. In 1935, Mascot Pictures produced a film on Foster's life entitled Harmony Lane, which was directed by Joseph Santley and starred Douglass Montgomery. Still another fictionalized biopic of Foster would be made in 1952. A B-picture entitled I Dream of Jeannie, it was released by Republic Pictures and starred Bill Shirley (Jeremy Brett's singing voice in My Fair Lady) as Foster.

In the film, Stephen Foster marries a girl from the South, but in real life, his wife was from Pittsburgh, as Foster was. Additionally, Foster was not known as a Confederate sympathizer nor were he or his songs criticized for this aspect during his actual life, unlike the film.

The film's final scene is wholly inaccurate; there was no performance by Edwin Pearce Christy on the day Foster died. In reality, Christy died nearly two years before Foster; he committed suicide by throwing himself out of a window at his home in New York City in May 1862. Foster himself died in January 1864.

== Awards ==
- Nominated for an Academy Award in the Music Scoring category.

== See also ==
- List of films and television shows about the American Civil War
