= Harmony Lane =

1935 film by Joseph Santley

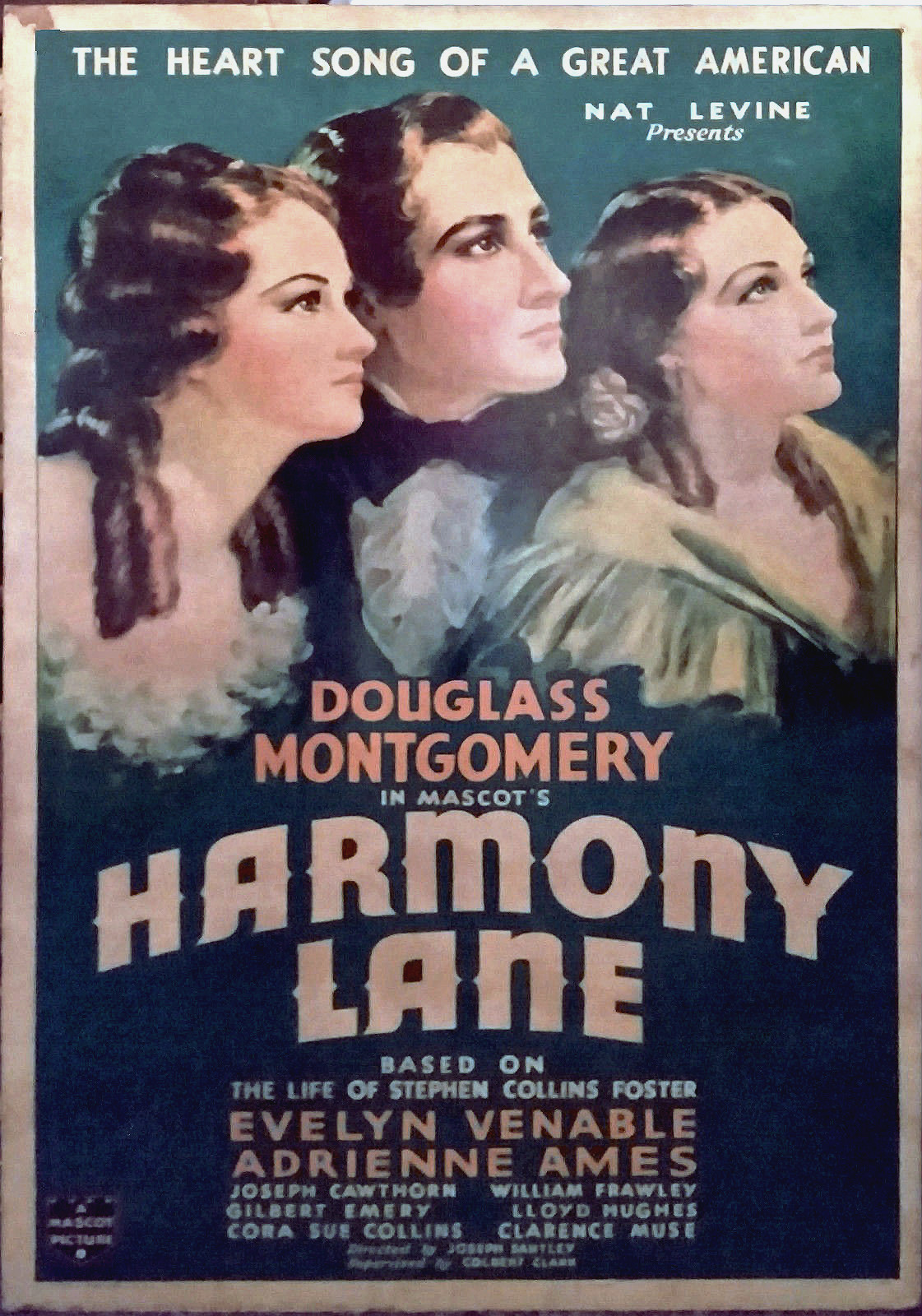
- Directed by: Joseph Santley
- Written by: Elizabeth Meehan (screenplay); Joseph Santley (screenplay); Milton Krims (story)
- Produced by: Nat Levine
- Starring: See below
- Cinematography: Jack A. Marta; Ernest Miller
- Edited by: Ray Curtiss
- Distributed by: Mascot Pictures
- Release date: October 23, 1935
- Running time: 89 minutes
- Country: United States
- Language: English

Harmony Lane is a 1935 low-budget American film directed by Joseph Santley, based upon the life of Stephen Foster, released by Mascot Pictures. The first sound film based on the life of the famous composer, two others followed, both in color: Swanee River (1939) (the most elaborate and largest budgeted of the three), and I Dream of Jeannie (1952).

== Plot summary ==
The life and loves of composer Stephen Foster, from his early success through his decline, degradation, and death from (assumed) alcoholism.

== Cast ==
- Douglass Montgomery as Stephen Foster
- Evelyn Venable as Susan Pentland
- Adrienne Ames as Jane McDowell
- Joseph Cawthorn as Professor Henry Kleber
- William Frawley as Edwin P. 'Ed' Christy
- David Torrence as Mr. Pentland
- Gilbert Emery as Mr. Foster
- Lloyd Hughes as Andrew Robinson
- Al Herman as Tambo
- Cora Sue Collins as Marian Foster
- James Bush as Morrison Foster
- Edith Craig as Henrietta Foster
- Florence Roberts as Mrs. Foster
- Ferdinand Munier as Mr. Pond
- Clarence Muse as Old Joe

== Soundtrack ==
- "Oh! Susanna"
- "Lou'siana Belle"
- "The Old Folks at Home"
- "My Old Kentucky Home"
- "Old Black Joe"
- "Why No One to Love"
- "Beautiful Dreamer"

All written by Stephen Foster
