= Marion Foster Welch =

Educator and composer

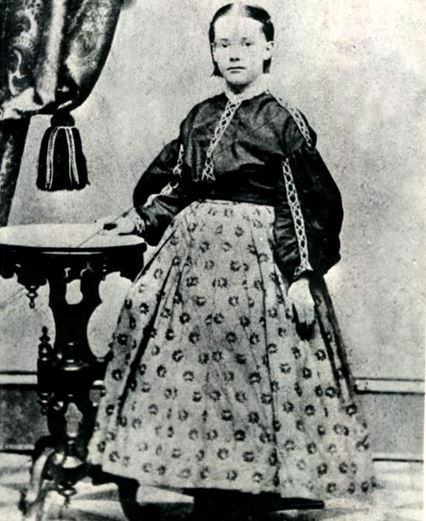
- Welch at about the age of ten
- Born: April 18, 1851; Pittsburgh, Pennsylvania, U.S.
- Died: July 9, 1935 (aged 84); Pittsburgh, Pennsylvania, U.S.
- Resting place: Allegheny Cemetery, Pittsburgh, Allegheny County, Pennsylvania, US
- Known for: Curator of the Stephen Foster Memorial, composer, lecturer
- Children: 1

Marion Welch (née Foster; April 18, 1851 – July 9, 1935) was the only child of composer Stephen Collins Foster and, together with her daughter, Jessie Rose, was the caretaker of the Stephen S. Foster Memorial Home, located at 3600 Penn Avenue, Pittsburgh, Pennsylvania, from 1914 until her death in 1935. She taught the piano and occasionally composed music.

== Early life ==
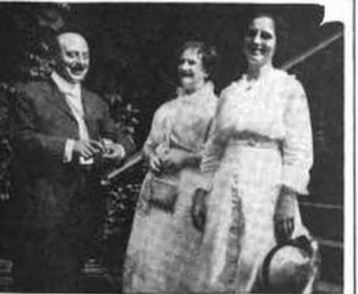
^{Marion Foster Welch outside the Foster home museum with W.D. Armstrong, a visiting composer on the left and the pianist Mrs. A.D. Mitchell on the right.}

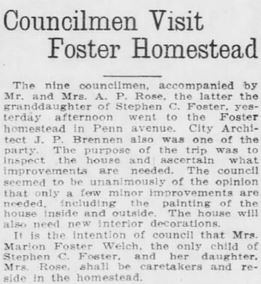
^{In 1914, the Pittsburgh City Council began their funding support of the museum and appointed Marion and Jessie Rose as caretakers}

Marion Foster was born on April 18, 1851, at the home of her uncle, William Barclay Foster Jr. Her parents, Stephen Collins Foster and Jane Foster, then moved with her to the home of her paternal grandfather, and a few months later they moved back to her grandparents' home.

In 1861, Jane and Marion moved to Lewistown, Pennsylvania, where Welch began attending school. In 1864, she was joined by five cousins whose father had died in an accident, cousins who subsequently moved in with her and her mother. Her grandmother also moved in at this time.

Around 1870, Welch married Walter Welsh, with whom she had three children. Welch did not raise her first child, Jessie, who was raised to adulthood by her grandmother.

== Cultural contributions ==
In 1879, Welch and her mother secured the copyright for "I Would Not Die in the Summertime." When the copyright expired on "Old Folks at Home", they renewed it for a fourteen-year period.

In 1893, she and her mother filed a suit alleging copyright violation of Stephen Foster's song, "Old Folks at Home". In 1895, Welch was living in Chicago.

In 1900, she unveiled the Stephen Foster Memorial in Highland Park.

In 1906, Welch unveiled a model of the statue then being built in Frankfort, in honour of Stephen Foster and his song "My Old Kentucky Home". In a ceremony in Louisville, Kentucky, a chorus of 1,000 children sang some of her father's works.

In 1913, citizens in Pittsburgh initiated fundraising to preserve Stephen Foster's place of birth in the city as a memorial to him.

Philanthropist James H. Park bought the property outright the following year and asked Welch and Jessie Rose to become the live-in caretakers of the house. The city of Pittsburgh assumed financial responsibility for the property, helping to upkeep and preserve it. Park gave the house at 3600 Penn Avenue, known as the Stephen S. Foster Memorial Home, to the city of Pittsburgh in July 1916.

In 1926, Welch visited Canonsburg, where the community celebrated Foster's music and shared reminiscences about her father.

In 1929, she was Canonsburg's guest of honor in a celebration of her father's work, where she played both her own music and her father's. She was described by the local paper as having a youthful outlook on life, despite being more than seventy-seven years old.

After Josiah Lilly built the Stephen Foster Memorial in 1937, staff from the memorial spoke to Welch about her family's genealogy. Fletcher Hodges, Jr., who was the first curator of the Foster Hall Collection at the memorial, noted in 1948 that Marion Welch had "provided a link between her father and the present". In her later years she spent her time with her daughter and granddaughter.

== Music ==
Welch taught music and piano. Fletcher Hodges noted that Foster Welch was "long known as a piano teacher" in Pittsburgh, and that "many Pittsburghers have received their first instruction in the art of music" from her.

She occasionally composed music of her own. Welch and Frank S. Bracken composed the songs "The Whole Woods Ring" and "On the Hills of Hollywood" together. She continued to write and interpret musical scores for her friends "even in the last months of her life." However, since few were found later, it was suspected that her musical writing may have been destroyed. Some say that she was "not able to attain fame of a like order" when compared to her father.

== Legal disputes ==
Welch twice attempted to force the United States government to honor the contract that was established years before in court. The premise of the legal action was that the U.S. did not pay for the military's use and occupation of her grandfather's estate during the War of 1812. She also filed suit against at least one publisher who was infringing upon her copyrights.

== Archived content ==
Primary source material including family letters concerning the life of Welch are housed in the University of Pittsburgh Library System Archives Service Center. These have been digitized and are accessible remotely. The Pittsburgh Post-Gazette also maintains archives of numerous newspaper articles about Welch.

== Philanthropic activities ==
On September 12, 1900, Welch unveiled one of the first monuments created to commemorate her father. She appeared at one of many commemorative events as far away as Kentucky where she appeared before a crowd of about one thousand to unveil a statue of her father.

== Death ==
Welch's cause of death in 1935, aged 84, was a heart attack brought on by asthma.
