= Jeanie with the Light Brown Hair (TV series) =

Japanese anime television series

- Bill (playing the banjo), Steven, and Jeanie
- 風の中の少女 金髪のジェニー
- Genre: Music, biography, romance
- Created by: Fumio Ishimori
- Written by: Fumio Ishimori; Nobuyuki Fujimoto; Mai Sunaga
- Directed by: Ryō Yasumura
- Music by: Hideo Shimazu
- Country of origin: Japan
- Original language: Japanese
- No. of episodes: 52

Production
- Executive producer: Koichi Motohashi
- Producers: Mutsuo Shimizu (TV Tokyo); Takaji Matsudo; Shun'ichi Kosao (Nippon Animation)
- Production companies: TV Tokyo; Nippon Animation

Original release
- Network: TXN (TV Tokyo)
- Release: October 15, 1992 – September 30, 1993

The Girl in the Wind: Jeanie with the Light Brown Hair (風の中の少女 金髪のジェニー, Kaze no Naka no Shōjo: Kinpatsu no Jenī) is a Japanese animated television series produced by Nippon Animation which ran for 52 episodes on TV Tokyo from October 1992 to September 1993. It is based on the 1854 song "Jeanie with the Light Brown Hair" by Stephen Foster.

== Outline ==
This work depicts the childhood of the composer Stephen Foster and his wife Jane McDowell Foster Wiley. The original is the novel based on the biography of Stephen Foster, written by Fumio Ishimori. Among music-themed anime, this work is an anime whose theme is not only music but also biography, and depicts the childhood of a noted composer, but the anime itself has almost nothing to do with the real Foster or his wife. It is one of companion volumes of the World Masterpiece Theater, broadcast on TV Tokyo from 19:30 to 20:00 on Thursday.

This work is the last anime based on Western literatures which was produced by Nippon Animation. In fact, there are no anime based on Western literatures in anime that were first broadcast since 1993, except for Fuji TV's World Masterpiece Theater series.

== Synopsis ==
The story begins in a small town in Pennsylvania in 1838. Jeanie MacDowell is a cheerful and beautiful girl with light brown hair (although this could be perceived as being blonde hair). Jeanie enjoys playing the piano and loves taking piano lessons from her mother.

Steven, a good harmonica player, and Bill, a boy who is good at playing the banjo, are great friends of Jeanie's. They enjoy playing music together like a small band.

Jeanie's happy life changes dramatically after her mother suddenly passes away. Experiencing many difficulties and learning the importance of life, she decides to devote her life to helping many people suffering from illness.

== Characters ==
- Narrator: Toshiko Fujita

=== Main trio ===
- Jeanie MacDowell: Voiced by: Mitsuko Horie
- Steven Foster: Voiced by: Toshiko Fujita
- Bill: Voiced by: Masami Kikuchi

=== Other characters ===
- Freddie MacDowell: Voiced by: Kinryū Arimoto

Jeanie's father.

- Angela MacDowell: Voiced by: Waka Kanda

Jeanie's mother.

- Dr. Sandy: Voiced by: Keaton Yamada
- Diana: Voiced by: Masako Katsuki

Jeanie's stepmother.

- Robert: Voiced by: Hiro Yūki
- Big Joe: Voiced by: Takkō Ishimori

Bill's father.

- Mammy: Voiced by: Noriko Oka
- Henry Foster: Voiced by: Hidetoshi Nakamura
- Susan: Voiced by: Kei Hayami
- Ms. Garland: Voiced by: Rumiko Ukai

An illiberal teacher.

- Betty Lambert: Voiced by: Yuri Shiratori
- Cathy: Voiced by: Masako Miura
- Mora: Voiced by: Kumiko Nishihara
- Kanna: Voiced by: Sakiko Tamagawa
- Sister Nancy Conrad: Voiced by: Sumi Shimamoto
- Dr. Jason: Voiced by: Mitsuo Senda
- Jackson
- Carla

A snobbish student who dislikes Jeanie.

=== Animal characters ===
- Tray

Bill's domestic dog. It goes well with the Jeanie trio and can even save them from the crisis.

== Staff ==
- Director: Ryō Yasumura
- Assistant director: Hiroshi Nishikiori
- Scenario: Fumio Ishimori, Nobuyuki Fujimoto, Mai Sunaga
- Character design: Masahiro Kase
- Music: Hideo Shimazu
- Sound director: Etsuji Yamada
- Animation director: Masahiro Kase, Hirokazu Ishiyuki, Ikuo Shimazu, Moriyasu Taniguchi, Satoshi Tasaki
- Art director: Masamichi Takano
- Producer: Mutsuo Shimizu (TV Tokyo), Takaji Matsudo, Shun'ichi Kosao (Nippon Animation)
- Planning: Shōji Satō (Nippon Animation), Masunosuke Ōhashi (Dentsu Osaka branch)
- Production management: Junzō Nakajima (Nippon Animation)
- Production desk: Ken'ichi Satō
- Copyright management: Tadashi Hoshino
- Public relations: Caroline Briey (TV Tokyo)

== Theme songs ==
- Opening theme: Chasing the Sun (太陽を追いかけて, Taiyō o oikakete)
  - Singer: Mitsuko Horie
  - Lyricist: Kazunori Sonobe
  - Composer, arranger: Tomoki Hasegawa
- Ending theme: Mirror of Memories (思い出の鏡, Omoide no kagami)
  - Singer: Mitsuko Horie
  - Lyricist: Mitsuko Shiramine
  - Composer, arranger: Hideo Shimazu

The music collection of this work is titled as "Mirror of Memories", which is also the title of the ending theme, and occasionally inserts narrations by Mitsuko Horie who acts as the main character Jeanie McDowell.

== Episodes ==
No.	Title	Original release date	English airdate
1	"Hometown People"; Transliteration: "Kōkyō no Hitobito" (Japanese: 故郷の人々)	October 15, 1992	May 28, 2020
2	"A Local Horse Race"; Transliteration: "Kusakeiba" (Japanese: 草競馬)	October 22, 1992	May 28, 2020
3	"Please Don't Die, Mother"; Transliteration: "Shinanai de Kāsan" (Japanese: 死なないで母さん)	October 29, 1992	May 28, 2020
4	"Tears Are on the Other Side of Stars"; Transliteration: "Namida wa Hoshi no Kanata ni" (Japanese: 涙は星のかなたに)	November 5, 1992	May 28, 2020
5	"The Flashy Patient"; Transliteration: "Hanayaka na Kanja-san" (Japanese: 華やかな患者さん)	November 12, 1992	May 28, 2020
6	"An Appointment with Father"; Transliteration: "Otōsan to no Yakusoku" (Japanese: お父さんとの約束)	November 19, 1992	May 28, 2020
7	"An Unexpected Gift"; Transliteration: "Igai na Purezento" (Japanese: 意外なプレゼント)	November 26, 1992	May 28, 2020
8	"The Riddle of Ms. Diana"; Transliteration: "Daiana-san no Nazo" (Japanese: ダイアナさんの謎)	December 3, 1992	May 28, 2020
9	"My Best Friend Bertha"; Transliteration: "Yūjō no Bazā" (Japanese: 友情のバザー)	December 10, 1992	May 28, 2020
10	"A Night Alone"; Transliteration: "Hitoribotchi no Yoru" (Japanese: 一人ぼっちの夜)	December 17, 1992	May 28, 2020
11	"Father's Determination"; Transliteration: "Otōsan no Ketsui" (Japanese: お父さんの決意)	December 24, 1992	May 28, 2020
12	"A New Journey"; Transliteration: "Atarashii Tabidachi" (Japanese: 新しい旅立ち)	December 31, 1992	May 28, 2020
13	"The Strong Bonds of Friendship"; Transliteration: "Tsuyoi Yūjō no Kizuna" (Japanese: 強い友情のきずな)	January 7, 1993	May 28, 2020
14	"An Important Gift"; Transliteration: "Taisetsu na Okurimono" (Japanese: 大切なおくりもの)	January 14, 1993	May 28, 2020
15	"Morning of Goodbyes"; Transliteration: "Sayonara no Asa" (Japanese: さよならの朝)	January 21, 1993	May 28, 2020
16	"The Fate of Two Letters"; Transliteration: "Unmei no Nitsū no Tegami" (Japanese: 運命の二通の手紙)	January 28, 1993	May 28, 2020
17	"Goodbye to the Hometown"; Transliteration: "Sayonara Kokyō" (Japanese: さよなら故郷)	February 4, 1993	May 28, 2020
18	"A New Life"; Transliteration: "Atarashii Seikatsu" (Japanese: 新しい生活)	February 11, 1993	May 28, 2020
19	"An Enjoyable Sunday"; Transliteration: "Tanoshimi na Nichiyōbi" (Japanese: 楽しみな日曜日)	February 18, 1993	May 28, 2020
20	"Ms. Annamarie"; Transliteration: "Annamarī Sensei" (Japanese: アンナマリー先生)	February 25, 1993	May 28, 2020
21	"The Long Awaited Recital"; Transliteration: "Machidōshii Happyōkai" (Japanese: 待ち遠しい発表会)	March 4, 1993	May 28, 2020
22	"The Golden Watch of Friendship"; Transliteration: "Yūjō no Kindokei" (Japanese: 友情の金時計)	March 11, 1993	May 28, 2020
23	"A Goal of Friendship"; Transliteration: "Nerawareta Yūjō" (Japanese: 狙われた友情)	March 18, 1993	May 28, 2020
24	"I'm Not Gonna Lose"; Transliteration: "Watashi wa Makenai" (Japanese: 私は負けない)	March 25, 1993	May 28, 2020
25	"Alone on Christmas Eve"; Transliteration: "Hitoribotchi no Seiya" (Japanese: 一人ぼっちの聖夜)	April 1, 1993	May 28, 2020
26	"The School Ghost Rebellion"; Transliteration: "Gakuin Obake Sōdō" (Japanese: 学院おばけ騒動)	April 8, 1993	May 28, 2020
27	"Beginning a Journey to Freedom"; Transliteration: "Jiyū e no Tabidachi" (Japanese: 自由への旅立ち)	April 15, 1993	May 28, 2020
28	"The Beautiful Transfer Student"; Transliteration: "Utsukushiki Tenkōsei" (Japanese: 美しき転校生)	April 22, 1993	May 28, 2020
29	"Girls in Love"; Transliteration: "Koisuru Shōjotachi" (Japanese: 恋する少女たち)	April 29, 1993	October 22, 2020
30	"Becoming a Little Bit Grown Up"; Transliteration: "Choppiri Otona ni" (Japanese: ちょっぴり大人に)	May 6, 1993	October 22, 2020
31	"It's Gonna Be a Great Summer Vacation"; Transliteration: "Tanoshii Hazu no Natsu Yasumi" (Japanese: 楽しい筈の夏休み)	May 13, 1993	October 22, 2020
32	"Jeanie's Crisis"; Transliteration: "Jenī no Kiki" (Japanese: ジェニーの危機)	May 20, 1993	October 22, 2020
33	"Desperate Escape"; Transliteration: "Inochigake no Dasshutsu" (Japanese: 命がけの脱出)	May 27, 1993	October 22, 2020
34	"The Traveler with the Wandering Heart"; Transliteration: "Kokoro Kayoi Au Tabibito" (Japanese: 心通い合う旅人)	June 3, 1993	October 22, 2020
35	"The Exciting Treasure Hunt"; Transliteration: "Osawagase Hihō Tanken" (Japanese: お騒がせ秘宝探検)	June 10, 1993	October 22, 2020
36	"A Real Scream"; Transliteration: "Sana no Sakebi" (Japanese: 真実の叫び)	June 17, 1993	October 22, 2020
37	"The Sorrow of a Lonesome Bill"; Transliteration: "Kodoku na Biru no Nayami" (Japanese: 孤独なビルの悩み)	June 24, 1993	October 22, 2020
38	"Goodbye, Bill"; Transliteration: "Sayonara Biru" (Japanese: さよならビル)	July 1, 1993	October 22, 2020
39	"The Melody of My Heart"; Transliteration: "Waga Kokoro no Merodi" (Japanese: わが心のメロディ)	July 8, 1993	October 22, 2020
40	"Jeanie, Age 15"; Transliteration: "Jenī, 15-sai" (Japanese: ジェニー・15歳)	July 15, 1993	October 22, 2020
41	"Angels with Cold Eyes"; Transliteration: "Tsumetai Hitomi no Tenshitachi" (Japanese: 冷たい瞳の天使達)	July 22, 1993	October 22, 2020
42	"A Glass Full of Good Intentions"; Transliteration: "Gurasu Ippai no Zen'i" (Japanese: グラス一杯の善意)	July 29, 1993	October 22, 2020
43	"Let's Rescue the Teacher!"; Transliteration: "Sensei o Tasukero!" (Japanese: 先生を助けろ!)	August 5, 1993	October 22, 2020
44	"Jeanie's Determination"; Transliteration: "Jenī no Ketsudan" (Japanese: ジェニーの決断)	August 12, 1993	October 22, 2020
45	"Goodbye, Bessie"; Transliteration: "Sayonara Besshī" (Japanese: さよならベッシー)	August 19, 1993	October 22, 2020
46	"The First Dinner"; Transliteration: "Hajimete no Dinā" (Japanese: 初めてのディナー)	August 26, 1993	October 22, 2020
47	"Castaway on a Stormy Night"; Transliteration: "Arashi no Yoru no Hyōryūsha" (Japanese: 嵐の夜の漂流者)	September 2, 1993	October 22, 2020
48	"Eviction Tree"; Transliteration: "Tachinoki no Ki" (Japanese: たちのきの木)	September 9, 1993	October 22, 2020
49	"A Real Proposal"; Transliteration: "Sana no Puropōzu" (Japanese: 真実のプロポーズ)	September 16, 1993	October 22, 2020
50	"The Time Dreams Come True"; Transliteration: "Yume Kanau Toki" (Japanese: 夢かなうとき)	September 23, 1993	October 22, 2020
51	"Love Winter Days Are Gone"; Transliteration: "Ai ga Kieta Fuyu no Hi" (Japanese: 愛が消えた冬の日)	September 30, 1993	October 22, 2020
52	"Color Harmony Style"; Transliteration: "Kaze no Iro no Hāmonī" (Japanese: 風の色のハーモニー)	September 30, 1993	October 22, 2020

== Kinpatsu no Jeanie (1979 TV series) ==
This series is almost completely different from its 1992 counterpart.

During the civil war a girl living in Virginia, named Jeanie, waits for her old boyfriend Robert to marry him, according to a childish promise, but the war makes the things complicated and, Robert comes back as northerner soldier. Only with the conflict's end, and many misadventures, their dream will become true.

Episode list

1. My First Love
2. A Meeting of Hearts
3. The Rose Pendant
4. A Long-Awaited Reunion
5. Mother's Secret
6. So Close Yet So Far
7. The Beginning of A New Road
8. A Kiss
9. Goodbye My Dear
10. A Bittersweet Birthday
11. Boy Wearing A Dress?
12. Days That Will Not Return
13. I Will Look To The Future

== International broadcast ==
The series was broadcast in the Arab World on several Middle Eastern networks, titled ابنتي العزيزة... راوية ("My Dear Daughter").

In France, the series aired starting on December 23, 1996, on French TV channel TF1, during the children's program Club Dorothée. It aired as Le Rêve de Jeanie ("The Dream of Jeanie"). Only 38 episodes out of the total 52 were aired on French television, leaving episodes 39–52 unreleased on television on France. The anime was never released on DVD in France, and only received a TV airing.

In Italy, it aired on the private television channel Italia 1 in June 1994, titled Fiocchi di Cotone per Jeanie ("Cotton Balls for Jeanie"). It has since been released on DVD by Yamato Video with both the original Japanese audio and the Italian dub. The Italian version also had its own theme song, "Flakes of Cotton for Jeanie", performed by Cristina D'Avena. It has also been published on a streaming channel on YouTube under "Yamato Animation" by Italian anime distributor Yamato Video.

In Spain, the series was broadcast on the private television channel Telecinco in 1997, titled Dulce Jana ("Sweet Jana"). The Spanish version also had its own theme song, "Sweet Jana", performed by Sol Pilas.

In Indonesia, it was broadcast on RCTI, Lativi, and Spacetoon in mid-2000s.

In the Philippines, it was aired on ABS-CBN in 2002, rerun in 2004, and was rebroadcast on QTV-11 in 2010.

== See also ==
- My Daddy Long Legs: an anime planned by Masunosuke Ōhashi and starring Mitsuko Horie. Broadcast on Fuji TV in 1990.
- Moero! Top Striker: one of companion volumes of the World Masterpiece Theater aired on TV Tokyo on Thursday, and is the predecessor of this work.
