= Eliza Clayland Tomlinson Foster =

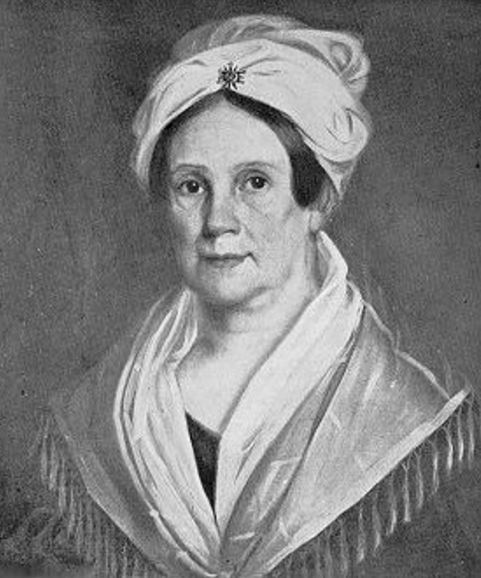
- Born: Eliza Clayland Tomlinson; 21 January 1788; Wilmington, Delaware
- Died: 18 January 1855 (aged 66); Pittsburgh
- Resting place: Allegheny Cemetery
- Known for: The mother of Stephen Collins Foster.
- Spouse: William Barclay Foster
- Children: Charlotte Susanna Foster (1809 - 1829), Anne Eliza Foster Buchanan (1812 - 1891), Henry Baldwin Foster (1816 - 1870), Henrietta Angelica Foster Thornton (1819 - 1879), Dunning McNair Foster (1821 - 1856), Morrison Foster (1823 - 1904), Stephen Foster (1826–1864)
- Relatives: Joseph Tomlinson, father; John and Joseph Tomlinson, half-brothers

Eliza Clayland Tomlinson Foster (1788-1855) was born in Wilmington, Delaware and raised by her deceased mother's family-the Claylands in Baltimore. She is best known for being an early settler of Pittsburgh and the mother of Morrison Foster and composer and lyricist Stephen Foster.

== Early life ==
Foster lived in Wilmington, Delaware until her marriage. Her family was part of the first group of settlers on the eastern coast of Maryland. She could be considered an orphan since after her birth her father had remarried after her mother's death and moved to Kentucky.

She was considered as being part of "an aristocratic family". The Claylands and Tomlinsons were some of the first families that settled in that area of Delaware. Stephen Foster is assumed to have gotten his "poetic temperament" from her. Her mother's family, the Claylands were Episcopalians and had settled in America after leaving England in 1670. A biographer described the Claylands as slaveholders, wealthy and active in political and social life during the American Revolution.

== Marriage and family life ==
Eliza Tomlinson met William Barclay Foster in Philadelphia while Eliza was staying with an aunt there. William was in the city on business after he had been promoted to a business partner position with the firm of Denny & Beelen. They married on November 14, 1807, at Chambersburg, Pennsylvania. Eliza was nineteen years old and William was twenty-eight. It took the couple two weeks to travel to Pittsburgh on horseback.

At this point in time, Pittsburgh was considered a frontier town and had a population of less than 3000. One biographer speculates that Eliza may have reacted to the relative unsophistication of Pittsburgh when she arrived in November 1807. It may have been a "a cultural shock" to the nineteen-year-old who was raised in East.

=== Children ===
Morrison Foster, her son, described her as "...the soul of purity, truth and Christian virtue. Her example shone upon her family, as the continual light from heaven. No unkind word ever passed between members of the family, for strife was repelled and anger was washed away by the stream of love." She died in 1855, within a few months of William. Eliza gave birth to four daughters and five sons. Two of these died as infants and one girl died in her teens. She also raised William Jr who was an illegitimate child from another woman fathered by her husband.

=== Economic hardships ===
Eliza lived through changing economic that brought hardships upon the family when William faced the loss of property.

== Family ==
Eliza had some other familial relationships. Her first cousin (or aunt) was Sarah Tomlinson, wife to Oliver Evans, Eliza was visiting Sarah when she met William Barclay Foster. Oliver Evans was an engineer and Eliza's son Morrison was employed by Evans. at one point.

== Archived biographical content ==
Primary source material including family letters and other items are housed in the University of Pittsburgh Library System Archives Service Center. These have been digitized and are accessible remotely.
