= Stephen Foster =

American composer and songwriter (1826–1864)

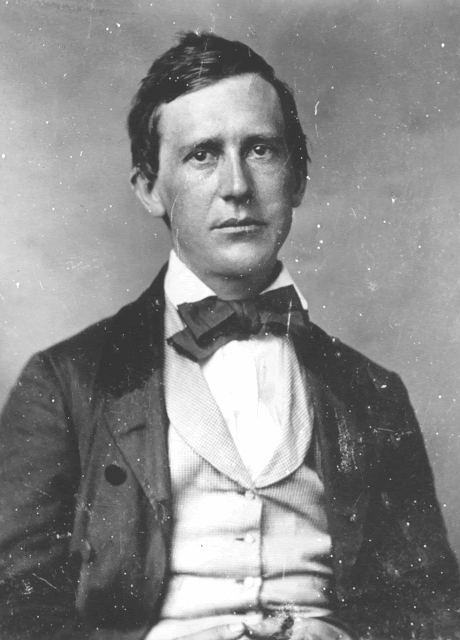
- Foster c. 1860
- Born: Stephen Collins Foster; July 4, 1826; Lawrenceville, Pennsylvania, U.S.
- Died: January 13, 1864 (aged 37); New York City, U.S.
- Resting place: Allegheny Cemetery (Pittsburgh, Pennsylvania, U.S.)
- Monuments: Stephen Foster Memorial
- Occupations: Composer; lyricist; poet
- Years active: 1844–1864
- Agent(s): Various sheet music publishers and brother, Morrison Foster
- Known for: First American full-time songwriter
- Notable work: "Beautiful Dreamer" "Camptown Races" "Hard Times Come Again No More" "My Old Kentucky Home" "Oh! Susanna" "Old Black Joe" "Old Folks at Home" among others...
- Style: American folk; minstrels
- Spouse: Jane McDowell Foster Wiley (m. 1850)
- Children: Marion
- Parents: William Barclay Foster (father); Eliza Clayland Tomlinson Foster (mother)
- Relatives: Morrison Foster (brother); Evelyn Foster Morneweck (niece)

Stephen Collins Foster (July 4, 1826 – January 13, 1864), known as "the father of American music", was an American composer known primarily for his parlour and folk music during the Romantic period. Foster wrote more than 200 songs, including "Oh! Susanna", "Hard Times Come Again No More", "Camptown Races", "Old Folks at Home" ("Swanee River"), "My Old Kentucky Home", "Jeanie with the Light Brown Hair", "Old Black Joe", and "Beautiful Dreamer". Many of his compositions remain popular in the 21st century.

== Early life ==
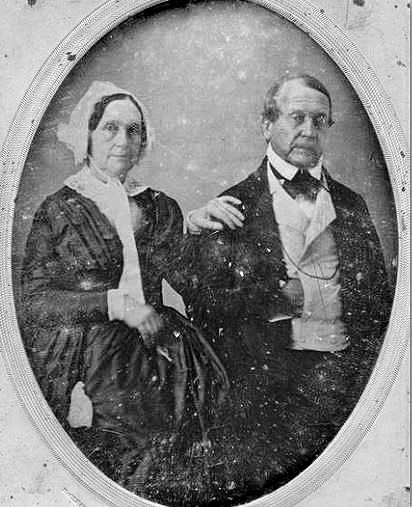
Foster's parents, Eliza Tomlinson Foster and William Barclay Foster

There are many biographies of Foster, but details differ widely. Among other issues, he wrote very little biographical information himself, and his brother Morrison Foster may have destroyed much information that he judged to reflect negatively upon the family.

Foster was born on July 4, 1826, in Lawrenceville, Pennsylvania. His parents, William Barclay Foster and Eliza Clayland Tomlinson Foster, were of Ulster Scots and English descent. Foster had three older sisters and six older brothers. He attended private academies in Allegheny, Athens, and Towanda, Pennsylvania, and received an education in English grammar, diction, the classics, penmanship, Latin, Greek, and mathematics.

Foster showed early signs of musical aptitude as a boy. His mother remembered him later in her life as a boy marching about with a feather in his cap and pounding on a drum while whistling "Auld Lang Syne". Foster taught himself to play the clarinet, drums, flute, guitar, and piano, as well as being a good whistler, whistling a lot of the music he wrote including "Old Folks At Home" "(Swanee River)".

In 1839, his brother William was serving his apprenticeship as an engineer at Towanda and thought that Stephen would benefit from being under the supervision of Henry Kleber (1816–1897), a German-born music dealer in Pittsburgh. Under Kleber, Stephen was exposed to music composition. Together, the pair studied the works of Mozart, Beethoven, Weber, Mendelssohn and Schubert.

The site of the Camptown Races – which would provide both the title and setting for events of one of Foster's best-known songs – was located 30 miles (48 km) from Athens and 15 miles (24 km) from Towanda. Foster's education included a brief period at Jefferson College in Canonsburg, Pennsylvania, now part of Washington & Jefferson College. (Note: His grandfather James Foster was an associate of John McMillan and a founding trustee of Canonsburg Academy, a predecessor institution to Jefferson College; his father William Barclay Foster attended Canonsburg Academy until age 16.) His tuition was paid, but Foster had little spending money. He left Canonsburg to visit Pittsburgh with another student and did not return.

== Career ==
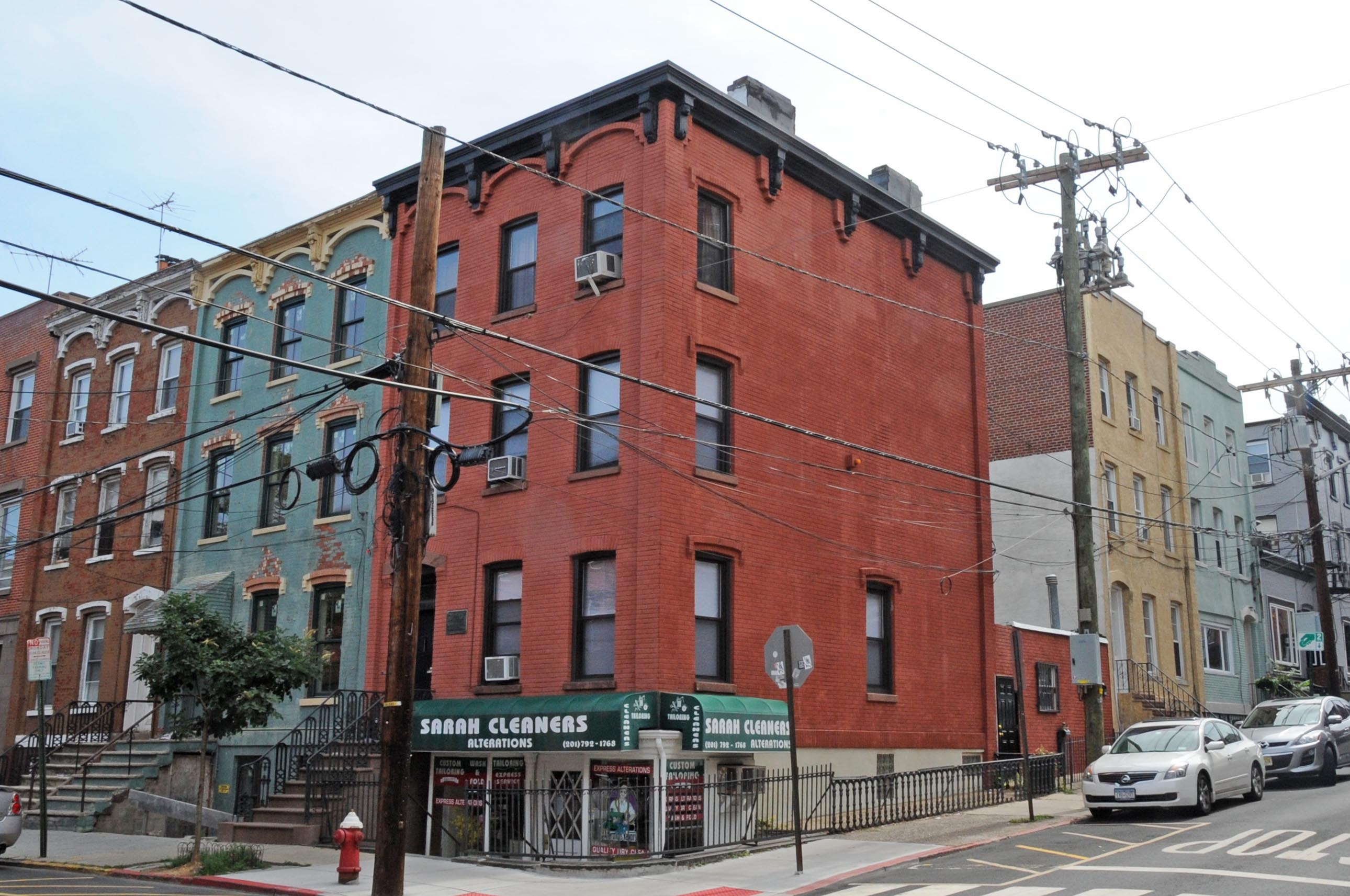
House in Hoboken, New Jersey, where Foster is believed to have written "Jeanie with the Light Brown Hair" in 1854

Foster married Jane Denny McDowell on July 22, 1850, and they visited New York and Baltimore on their honeymoon. He then returned to Pennsylvania and wrote most of his best-known songs: "Camptown Races" (1850), "Nelly Bly" (1850), "Ring de Banjo" (1851), "Old Folks at Home" (known also as "Swanee River", 1851), "My Old Kentucky Home" (1853), "Old Dog Tray" (1853), and "Jeanie with the Light Brown Hair" (1854), written for his wife Jane.

Many of Foster's songs were used in the blackface minstrel shows popular at the time. He sought to "build up taste...among refined people by making words suitable to their taste, instead of the trashy and really offensive words which belong to some songs of that order". However, Foster's output of minstrel songs declined after the early 1850s, as he turned primarily to parlor music. Many of his songs had Southern themes, yet Foster never lived in the South and visited it only once, during his 1852 honeymoon. Available archival evidence does not suggest that Foster was an abolitionist.

Foster's last four years were spent in New York City. There is little information on this period of his life, although family correspondence has been preserved.

== Illness and death ==
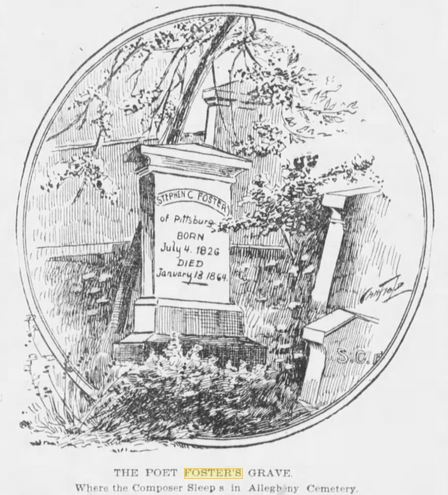
A Pittsburgh Press illustration of the original headstone on Stephen Foster's grave

Foster became sick with a fever in January 1864. Weakened, it is possible that he fell in his hotel in the Bowery and cut his neck; Foster may also have sought to kill himself. His writing partner George Cooper found Foster still alive but lying in a pool of blood. Foster died in Bellevue Hospital three days later at age 37. His leather wallet contained a scrap of paper that simply said, "Dear friends and gentle hearts", along with 37 cents in Civil War scrip and three pennies.

Other biographers describe different accounts of his death. Historian JoAnne O'Connell speculates in her biography, The Life and Songs of Stephen Foster, that Foster may have killed himself. As O'Connell and musicologist Ken Emerson have noted, several of the songs Foster wrote during the last years of his life foreshadow his death, such as "The Little Ballad Girl" and "Kiss Me Dear Mother Ere I Die." Emerson says in his 2010 Stephen Foster and Co. that Foster's injuries may have been "accidental or self-inflicted".

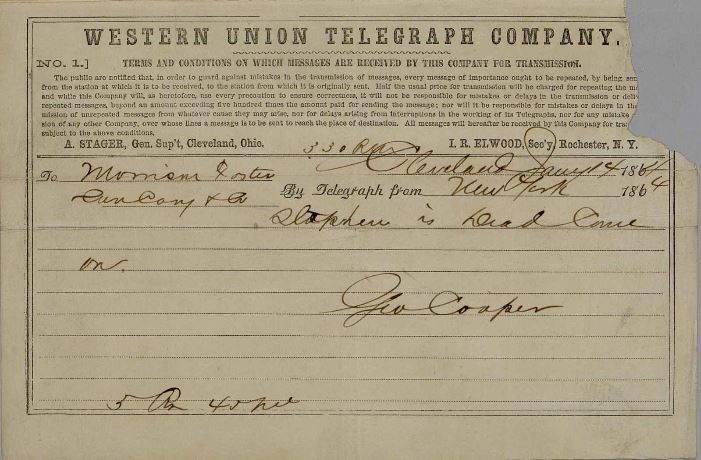
Telegram that communicated Stephen Foster's death addressed to his brother Morrison Foster

The note inside Foster's wallet is said to have inspired Bob Hilliard's lyric for "Dear Hearts and Gentle People" (1949). Foster was buried in the Allegheny Cemetery in Pittsburgh. After his death, Morrison Foster became his literary executor. As such, he answered requests for copies of manuscripts, autographs, and biographical information. One of his best-loved works, "Beautiful Dreamer", was posthumously published in 1864.

== Music ==
Foster grew up in Lawrenceville, now a neighborhood of Pittsburgh, where many European immigrants had settled and were accustomed to hearing the music of the Italian, Scots-Irish, and German residents. He composed his first song at age 14 and entitled it the "Tioga Waltz". The first song Foster had published was "Open thy Lattice Love" (1844). He wrote songs in support of drinking, such as "My Wife Is a Most Knowing Woman", "Mr. and Mrs. Brown", and "When the Bowl Goes Round", while also composing temperance songs such as "Comrades Fill No Glass for Me" or "The Wife".

Foster also authored many church hymns, although the inclusion of his hymns in hymnals ended by 1910. Some of the hymns are "Seek and ye shall find", "All around is bright and fair, While we work for Jesus", and "Blame not those who weep and sigh". Several rare Civil War-era hymns by Foster were performed by The Old Stoughton Musical Society Chorus, including "The Pure, The Bright, The Beautiful", "Over The River", "Give Us This Day", and "What Shall The Harvest Be?". He also arranged many works by Mozart, Beethoven, Donizetti, Lanner, Weber and Schubert for flute and guitar.

Foster usually sent his handwritten scores directly to his publishers. The publishers kept the sheet music manuscripts and did not give them to libraries nor return them to his heirs. Some of his original, hand-written scores were bought and put into private collections and the Library of Congress.

=== Popular songs ===
"My Old Kentucky Home" is the official state song of Kentucky, adopted by the General Assembly on March 19, 1928.

Foster's songs, lyrics, and melodies have often been altered by publishers and performers.

In 1957, Ray Charles released a version of "Old Folks at Home" that was titled "Swanee River Rock (Talkin' 'Bout That River)", which became his first pop hit that November.

In the 2000s, "Old Folks at Home", designated the official state song of Florida in 1935, came under attack for what some regarded as offensive terms in the song's lyrics. Changes were made to them with the approval of the Stephen Foster Memorial. The modified song was kept as the official state song, while "Florida (Where the Sawgrass Meets the Sky)" was added as the state anthem.

A 1974 published collection, Stephen Foster Song Book; Original Sheet Music of 40 Songs (New York : Dover Publications, Inc.), of Stephen Foster's popular songs was edited by musicologist Richard Jackson.

== Legacy ==
=== Songs ===
"Oh! Susanna" (1848)
Stephen Foster's "Oh! Susanna" performed by the United States Navy Concert Band

"Old Folks at Home"
"Old Folks at Home" performed by Ernestine Schumann-Heink (1918)

- Professor of folklore and musician John Minton wrote a song titled "Stephen C. Foster's Blues".
- Walt Kelly recorded an a cappella rendition of Foster's "Old Dog Tray" on the 1956 album Songs of the Pogo. Kelly regularly referenced "Old Dog Tray" as the theme song for his character Beauregard Hound Dog, from his comic strip Pogo.
- The Firesign Theatre makes many references to Foster's compositions in their CD Boom Dot Bust (1999, Rhino Records).
- Larry Kirwan of Black 47 mixes the music of Foster with his own in the musical Hard Times, which earned a New York Times accolade in its original run: "a knockout entertainment". Kirwan gives a contemporary interpretation of Foster's troubled later years and sets it in the tumultuous time of the New York draft riots and the Irish–Negro relations of the period. A revival ran at the Cell Theater in New York in early 2014, and a revised version of the musical called Paradise Square opened at Berkeley Repertory Theatre in 2018.
- Gordon Lightfoot wrote a song in 1970 titled "Your Love's Return (Song for Stephen Foster)."
- Randy Newman's 1970 album 12 Songs contained Newman's song "Old Kentucky Home" (originally titled "Turpentine and Dandelion Wine"), which is based on Foster's "My Old Kentucky Home, Good-Night!" Newman told Billboard magazine, "It's a good song because Stephen Foster wrote the hook". Under various titles, Newman's "Old Kentucky Home" was covered by the Beau Brummels, the Alan Price Set and Johnny Cash.
- Spike Jones recorded a comedy send-up "I Dream of Brownie with the Light Blue Jeans."
- Humorist Stan Freberg imagined a 1950s style version of Foster's music in "Rock Around Stephen Foster" and, with Harry Shearer, had a sketch about Foster having writer's block in a bit from his "United States of America" project.
- Songwriter Tom Shaner mentions Stephen Foster meeting up with Eminem's alter ego "Slim Shady" on the Bowery in Shaner's song "Rock & Roll is A Natural Thing".
- The music of Stephen Foster was an early influence on the Australian composer Percy Grainger, who stated that hearing "Camptown Races" sung by his mother was one of his earliest musical recollections. He went on to write a piece entitled "Tribute to Foster", a composition for mixed choir, orchestra, and pitched wine glasses based on the melody of "Camptown Races".
- Art Garfunkel was cast as Stephen Foster and sang his songs in an elementary school play in Queens, New York.
- Foster's name is included in the rapid-fire litany of musicians and songs that make up the lyrics of the 1974 pop novelty song "Life Is a Rock (But the Radio Rolled Me)" by Reunion.
- Neil Sedaka wrote and recorded a song about Foster and released it on his 1975 album, The Hungry Years.
- Alternative country duo The Handsome Family's song "Wildebeest", from their 2013 album Wilderness, is about Foster's death.
- Squirrel Nut Zippers wrote and recorded a song in 1998 titled "The Ghost of Stephen Foster".
- Stace England released in April 2024, as part of the group Foster's Satchel, a full-length album entitled Over the River: Stephen Foster Reimagined.
- John Fogerty of Creedence Clearwater Revival has said Foster's music inspired his own music, especially "Proud Mary".
- The musicologist Ken Emerson has suggested that some of Foster's songs are "a source of racial embarrassment and infuriation."

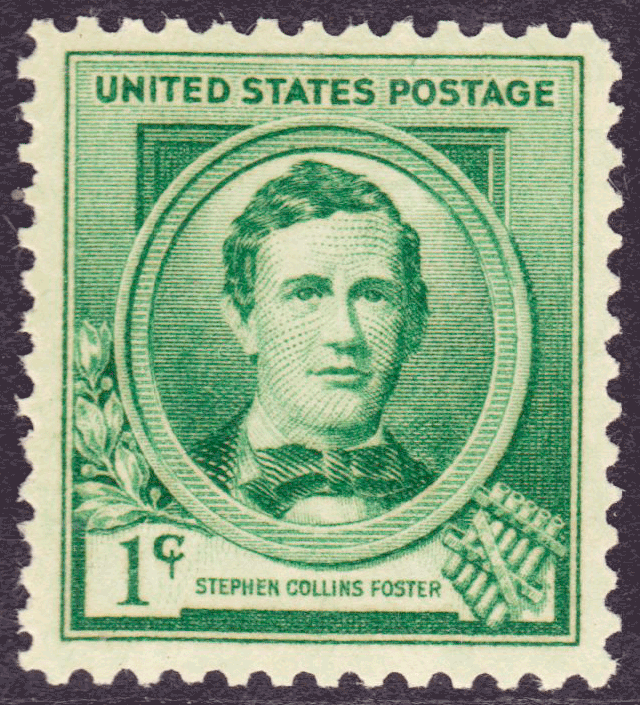
Foster commemorative stamp in the Famous American Composers series, 1940

=== Television ===
- Two television shows about the life of Foster and his childhood friend (and later wife) Jane MacDowell were produced in Japan, the first in 1979 with 13 episodes, and the second from 1992 to 1993 with 52 episodes; both were titled Jeanie with the Light Brown Hair after the song of the same name.
- In the Honeymooners episode "The $99,000 Answer", Ralph Kramden studies decades' worth of popular songs for his upcoming appearance on a television game show. Before each song, Ed Norton warms up on the piano by playing the opening to "Swanee River". On the program, Ralph is asked his first question for just 100 dollars: "Who is the composer of 'Swanee River'?" Ralph freezes, then nervously responds "Ed Norton?" and loses.
- In a "Fractured Fairy Tales" segment of The Rocky and Bullwinkle Show, Aladdin finds a lamp with a female genie with light brown hair, who immediately asks, "Are you Stephen Foster?"
- Lucille Ball, in an episode of The Lucy Show, announces that she is about to play a record called "Bing Crosby Sings Stephen Foster." A Crosby impressionist is heard singing (to the melody of "Camptown Races") "A-bum-bum-bum-bum bum-bum-bum, Stephen, Foster..."

=== Film ===
Many early filmmakers selected Foster's songs for their work because his copyrights had expired and cost them nothing. The 1935 technicolor musical short film Memories and Melodies depicts Collins trying to sell a song at the local music shop and reminiscing. Other Hollywood films include Harmony Lane (1935) with Douglass Montgomery, Swanee River (1939) with Don Ameche, and I Dream of Jeanie (1952), with Bill Shirley. The 1939 production was one of Twentieth Century Fox's more ambitious efforts, filmed in Technicolor; the other two were low-budget affairs made by B-movie studios.

- In the film Tombstone (1993), Billy Clanton (played by Thomas Haden Church) tries to bait Doc Holliday (Val Kilmer), who is playing a Chopin nocturne on the piano, by saying, "Is that 'Old Dog Tray'? That sounds like 'Old Dog Tray' to me." When the goad fails, Clanton asks whether Doc knows any other songs, like "'Camptown Races'?, 'Oh Susanna', You know, Stephen stinkin' Foster?!?"
- In the film A Million Ways to Die in the West, Seth MacFarlane's character, Albert, can't get Foster's song "If You've Only Got a Mustache", from the previous scene, out of his head. Charlize Theron's character suggests singing a different song, to which he replies, "There are only like 3 songs", and she adds "And they're all by Stephen Foster."
- In the 1949 film Mighty Joe Young the character Jill Young (Terry Moore) is able to calm her pet 12-foot-tall gorilla by whistling or playing "Beautiful Dreamer".
- In the movie Frankie and Johnny (1966), starring Elvis Presley, Johnny (Elvis's character) talking to Cully (played by Harry Morgan) when reviewing a song says "Let's hear it Stephen Foster".

=== Places ===
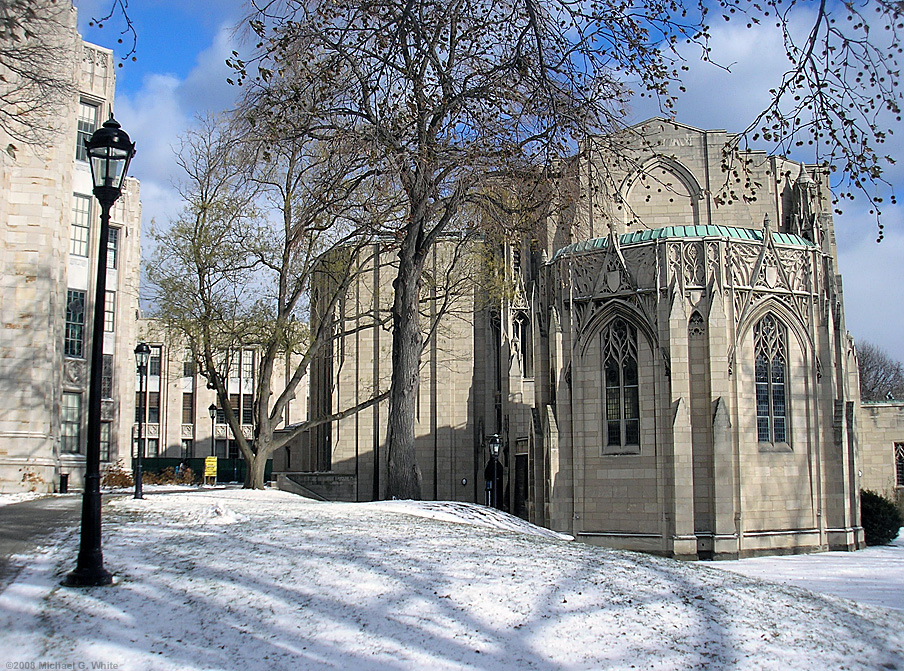
The Stephen Foster Memorial at the University of Pittsburgh contains two theaters.

Foster is honored on the University of Pittsburgh campus with the Stephen Foster Memorial, a landmark building that houses the Stephen Foster Memorial Museum, the Center for American Music, and two theaters: the Charity Randall Theatre and Henry Heymann Theatre, both performance spaces for Pitt's Department of Theater Arts. It is the largest repository for original Stephen Foster compositions, recordings, and other memorabilia his songs have inspired worldwide.

Two state parks are named in Foster's honor: the Stephen Foster Folk Culture Center State Park in White Springs, Florida, and Stephen C. Foster State Park in Georgia. Both parks are on the Suwannee River. Stephen Foster Lake at Mt. Pisgah State Park in Pennsylvania is named after him.

My Old Kentucky Home State Park, a state park in Bardstown, Kentucky, was named in honor of Foster's song "My Old Kentucky Home". It includes a historic mansion formerly named Federal Hill, where Foster is said to have been an occasional visitor according to his brother, Morrison Foster.

=== Art ===
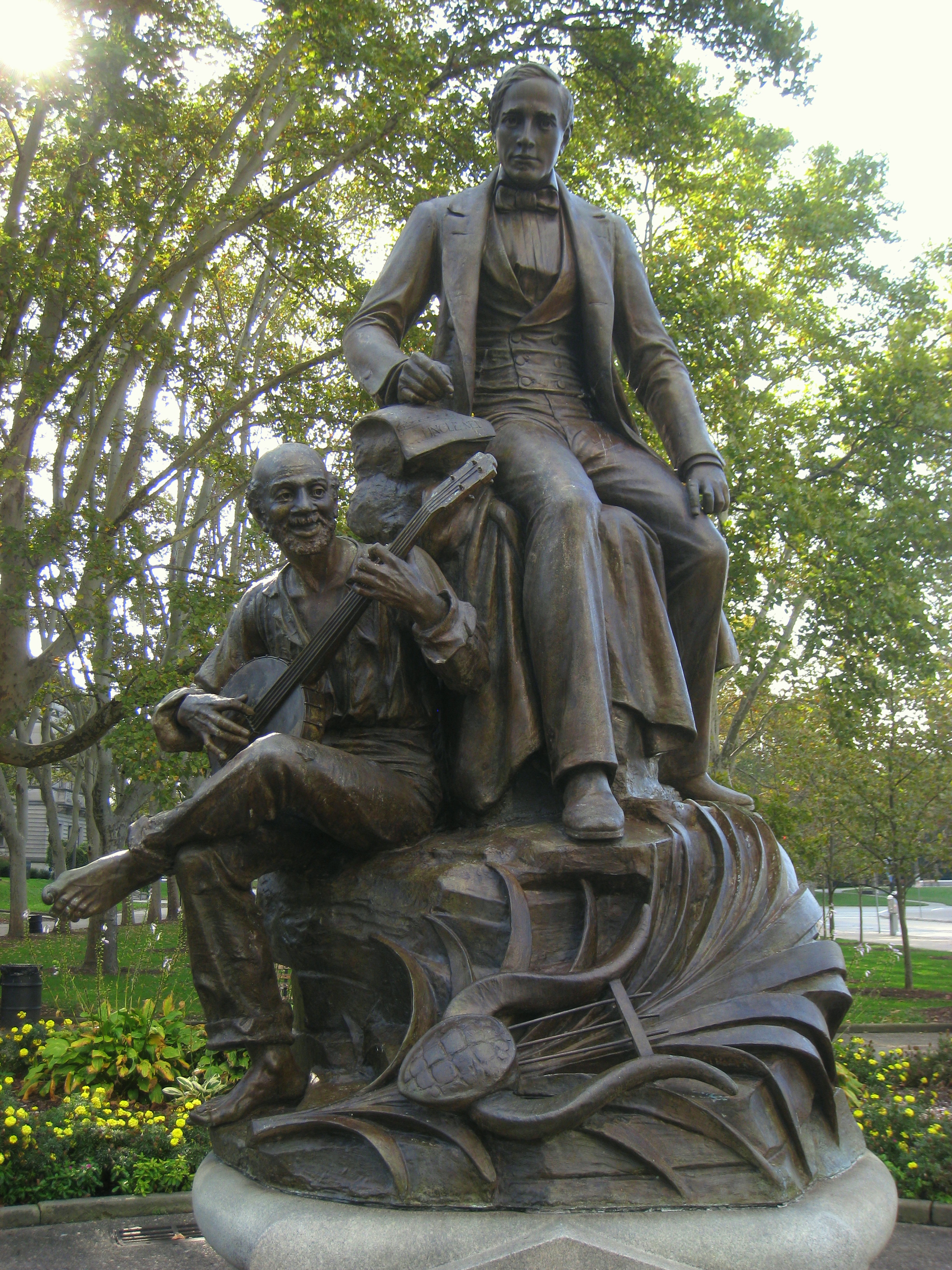
Stephen Foster sculpture in Schenley Plaza, Pittsburgh, by Giuseppe Moretti (1900), removed in 2018

- A public sculpture by Giuseppe Moretti honoring Foster and commemorating his song "Old Uncle Ned" sat near the Stephen Foster Memorial until 2018. The statue was removed following complaints about the banjo-playing slave seated next to Foster.
- In Alms Park in Cincinnati, overlooking the Ohio River, there is a seated statue of him.
- The Hall of Fame for Great Americans in the Bronx, overlooking the Harlem River, has a bronze bust of him by artist Walker Hancock. Added in 1940, he is among only 98 honorees from 15 classes of distinguished men and women.
- In My Old Kentucky Home State Park in Bardstown, Kentucky, a musical called The Stephen Foster Story has been performed since 1958. There is also a statue of him next to the Federal Hill mansion, where he visited relatives and which is the inspiration for "My Old Kentucky Home". A painting by Howard Chandler Christy entitled Stephen Foster and the Angel of Genius is on display in the park's art collection. The painting inspired Florence Foster Jenkins to author a tableau in which she plays the role of the angel depicted in Christy's painting. The scene was featured in the film Florence Foster Jenkins in 2016.
- In 1936, Congress authorized the minting of a silver half dollar in honor of the Cincinnati Musical Center. Foster was featured on the obverse of the coin.

=== Events ===
- "Stephen Foster! Super Saturday" is a day of thoroughbred racing during the Spring/Summer meet at Churchill Downs in Louisville, Kentucky. During the call to the post, selections of Stephen Foster songs are played by the track bugler, Steve Buttleman. The day is headlined by the Stephen Foster Handicap, a Grade I dirt race for older horses at 9 furlongs.
- Taylor Mac's A 24-Decade History of Popular Music includes a "Father of American Music Smackdown" in hour eight putting Foster's more problematic qualities up against the figure of Walt Whitman.
- 36 U.S.C. §140 designates January 13 as Stephen Foster Memorial Day, a day observed by the United States federal government. The law took effect on November 2, 1966, and the day was first observed in January 1967.
- Stephen Foster Music Camp is a summer music camp held on Eastern Kentucky University's campus of Richmond, Kentucky. The camp offers piano courses, choir, band, and orchestra ensembles.
- The Lawrenceville Historical Society, together with the Allegheny Cemetery Historical Association, hosts the annual Stephen Foster Music and Heritage Festival (Doo Dah Days!). Held the first weekend of July, Doo Dah Days! celebrates the life and music of one of the most influential songwriters in America's history. His home in the Lawrenceville section of Pittsburgh, Pennsylvania, still remains on Penn Avenue near the Stephen Foster Community Center.

== See also ==
- Stephen Foster Collection and archive
