= Five and Ten =

Five and Ten may refer to:

- Five and Ten (1931 film), a romantic drama starring Marion Davies
- Five and Ten (card game), a Scottish card game dating back to at least 1550

== See also ==
- Five and ten cent store
