= The Mystery of Edwin Drood (1935 film) =

1935 film by Stuart Walker

- Directed by: Stuart Walker
- Screenplay by: John L. Balderston; Gladys Unger
- Based on: The Mystery of Edwin Drood unfinished 1870 novel by Charles Dickens
- Produced by: Carl Laemmle, Jr.
- Starring: Claude Rains; Douglass Montgomery; Heather Angel; Valerie Hobson; David Manners
- Cinematography: George Robinson
- Edited by: Edward Curtiss
- Music by: Edward Ward
- Production company: Universal Pictures Corp.
- Distributed by: Universal Pictures Corp.
- Release date: 4 February 1935
- Running time: 87 minutes
- Country: United States
- Language: English
- Budget: $215,375

The Mystery of Edwin Drood is a 1935 American melodrama film directed by Stuart Walker and based on the unfinished 1870 novel The Mystery of Edwin Drood by Charles Dickens.

== Plot ==
An opium-addicted choirmaster develops an obsession for a beautiful young girl and will not stop short of murder in order to have her.

== Cast ==
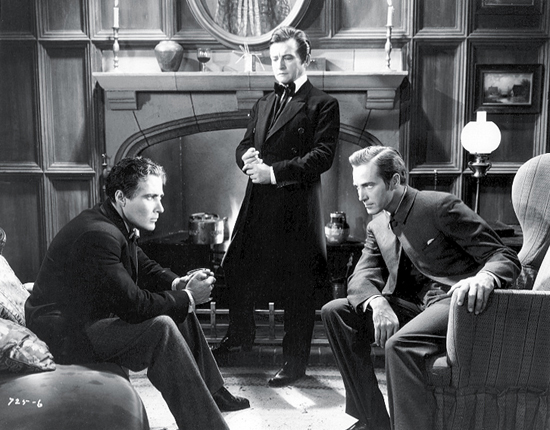
Douglass Montgomery, Claude Rains and David Manners in The Mystery of Edwin Drood

- Claude Rains as John Jasper
- David Manners as Edwin Drood
- Heather Angel as Rosa Bud
- Valerie Hobson as Helna Landless
- E.E. Clive as Mayor Sapsea
- Francis L. Sullivan as Rev. Mister Crisparkle
- Douglass Montgomery as Neville Landless
- Walter Kingsford as Mr. Grewgious
- Zeffie Tilbury as Princess Puffer
- J.M. Kerrigan as Chief Verger Tope
- Walter Brennan as Milk Man
- Harry Cording as Turke (uncredited)

== Production ==
Universal Pictures was enthusiastic about adapting The Mystery of Edwin Drood and exploiting its lack of a finale. Universal afforded the film a budget of $215,375 and developed an aggressive advertising campaign to exploit the novel's unresolved ending. According to Universal publicity, the studio's London office shot thousands of feet of film and took numerous still shots of Victorian-style structures in Rochester in 1934 for the film. A set was built in Universal's backlot that was the largest for the studio since the filming of The Hunchback of Notre Dame (1923). The film's shooting was initially delayed because of casting difficulties. Production began on November 12, 1934, and continued until January 1935.

The film was one of the last leading roles for David Manners, who plays Edwin Drood. In later years, Manners said: "[I] didn't like movies. You see, in a play you become the play, because you start in the beginning and end up at the end of the script. Movies, you do little bits and you don't know where it fits in.... It has no unity." When asked about The Mystery of Edwin Drood, Manners responded that " ... it was not a good movie at all."

== Reception ==
The film was released by Universal Pictures on February 4, 1935.

In the book Universal Horrors, the film is described as "neither an all-out horror story nor a puzzling whodunnit" and defined in contemporary terms as "a quaintly charming and atmospheric Victorian melodrama" lacking real suspense.

The film was generally well received by critics upon its release. William Boehnel of The New York World-Telegram declared the film "a thoroughly entertaining, exciting and atmospherically fine screen version of the novel." Eileen Creelman of the New York Sun declared it "a gruesome melodrama with enough action and background mystery to make it go." Bland Johaneson of the New York Daily Mirror declared the film "handsomely produced and acted" and that it would hold audiences in "complete interest."

Andre Sennwald of The New York Times declared that "[the film's] combination of adroit direction and acting isn't strong enough to overcome an essentially weak narrative." In the United Kingdom, Kinematograph Weekly said that "Individual acting is very good, and the atmosphere is faithful in detail, but neither can invest the story development with strong suspense nor preserve its secret," concluding that "There is no denying that Claude Rains is a brilliant actor, this does not prevent his mannerisms and inflections from becoming a trifle monotonous."

In a modern-day retrospective review, Craig Butler of AllMovie stated that the film's screenplay "is too often predictable and too seldom surprising" and that Stuart Walker had directed the film "efficiently and with a touch of flair here and there; it's not outstanding work." Butler concluded: "Where Drood shines is in its cast, led by a typically marvelous Claude Rains, who conveys the lust, shame, desperation, and determination of his character with aplomb. Douglass Montgomery is quite good in a dual role, and Heather Angel is appropriately lovely and timid. E.E. Clive and Zeffie Tilbury also are impressive in supporting roles." Butler stated that The Mystery of Edwin Drood "may not be a great film, but the actors make it decent entertainment."

== See also ==
- List of Universal Pictures films (1930–1939)
