= Evelyn Foster Morneweck =

- Born: Evelyn Foster; December 29, 1887
- Died: December 5, 1973 (aged 85); Pittsburgh
- Resting place: Allegheny Cemetery, Pittsburgh, Pennsylvania, United States
- Known for: Biographer of Stephen Foster and Morrison Foster
- Spouse: Alfred Charles Morneweck (1886–1968)

Evelyn Foster Morneweck (December 29, 1887 – December 5, 1973) was an American author and biographer of Stephen Collins Foster. She wrote "My Uncle Stephen by Evelyn Foster Morneweck (A True Account of Little Known Incidents in the Life of Stephen Collins Foster)" and Chronicles of Stephen Foster's Family, Volumes 1 and 2.

Her father, Morrison Foster, was also a biographer and also published a biography of Stephen. Her biographical account of Stephen Collins Foster and other family members can be accessed online.
