= Beautiful Dreamer =

Parlor song by Stephen Foster

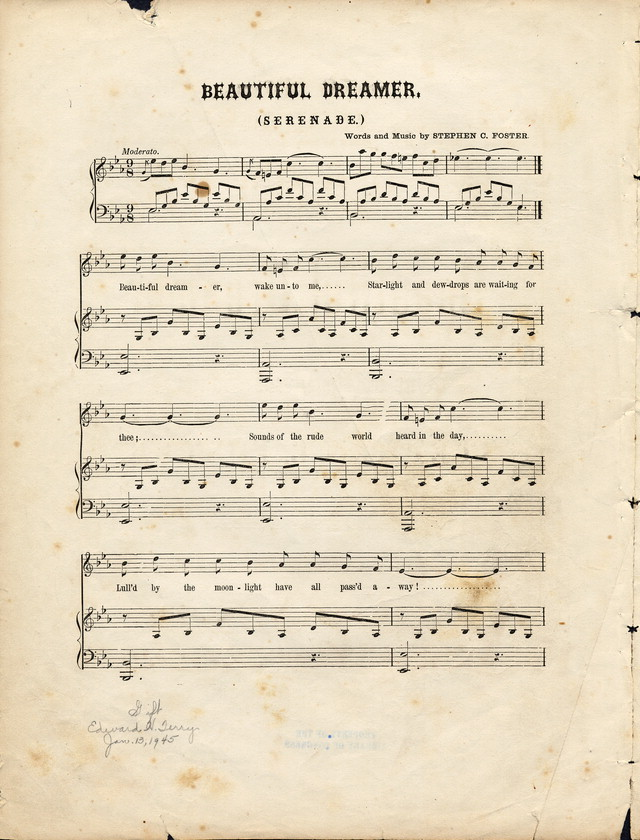
- Sheet music, 1st edition

Song
- Written: possibly 1862
- Published: March 1864
- Songwriter: Stephen Foster

"Beautiful Dreamer" is a parlor song by American songwriter Stephen Foster. It was published posthumously in March 1864, by Wm. A. Pond & Co. of New York. The first edition states on its title page that it is "the last song ever written by Stephen C. Foster, composed but a few days prior to his death." However, Carol Kimball, the author of Song, points out that the first edition's copyright is dated 1862, which suggests, she writes, that the song was composed and readied for publication two years before Foster's death. There are at least 20 songs, she observes, that claim to be Foster's last, and it is unknown which is indeed his last. The song is set in 9/8 time with a broken chord accompaniment.

The song tells of a lover serenading a "Beautiful Dreamer" who is oblivious to worldly cares and may actually be dead. Foster's works feature many dead young women, including his sister Charlotte and "Jeanie with the Light Brown Hair". Helen Lightner writes, "This sentimental ballad is folk-like in character with its repetitious but lovely melody and its basic harmonic accompaniment ... The quiet and calm of this mood is portrayed by the monotony of the arpeggiated accompaniment, by the repetitiveness of the melodic pattern, and by the strophic form itself."

== Lyrics ==
1.
Beautiful dreamer, wake unto me,
Starlight and dewdrops are waiting for thee;
Sounds of the rude world, heard in the day,
Lull'd by the moonlight have all passed away!
Beautiful dreamer, queen of my song,
List while I woo thee with soft melody;
Gone are the cares of life's busy throng,
Beautiful dreamer, awake unto me!
Beautiful dreamer, awake unto me!

2.
Beautiful dreamer, out on the sea,
Mermaids are chanting the wild lorelei;
Over the streamlet vapors are borne,
Waiting to fade at the bright coming morn.
Beautiful dreamer, beam on my heart,
E'en as the morn on the streamlet and sea;
Then will all clouds of sorrow depart,
Beautiful dreamer, awake unto me!
Beautiful dreamer, awake unto me!

== Recordings, film, and literature ==
=== Recordings ===
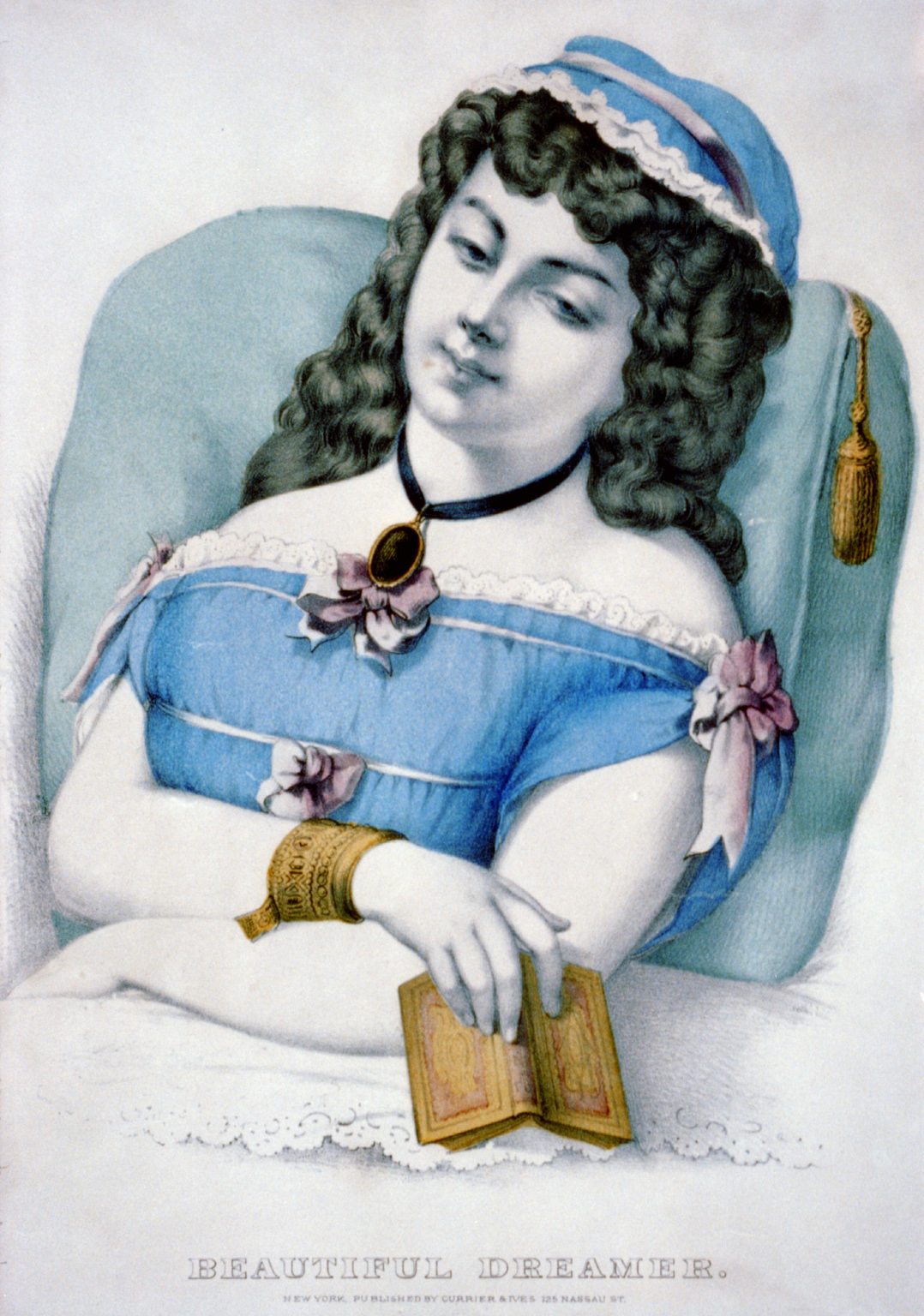
"Beautiful Dreamer" by Currier and Ives

Nat Shilkret & the Victor Salon Group recorded Beautiful Dreamer" in 1928. and Richard Crooks recorded it in 1937. It was then recorded by Bing Crosby with John Scott Trotter & his Orchestra in 1940;; by The Sons of the Pioneers with a solo by Tim Spencer in 1941 with Jack Byfield & His Orchestra. Al Jolson recorded it in 1950.

In 1954 a "waltz adaptation" tempo was given to the song by Johnny Corvo with the Moonbeams vocal group and Paul Allen's Orchestra in 1954; and it appeared again as a waltz by Slim Whitman in the same year; and it retained a softened waltz temp in a half-sung-half-sung version by Gene Miller's Sensational Ink Spots in 1956.

The song underwent a revival in the 1960s, both in its original form and with a variety of modernized, upbeat tempos, new lyrics, and even a parody version.

The US country singer Jim Reeves recorded the song while on tour in South Africa in 1962, sung in Afrikaans under the title Bolandse Nooientjie. (A brief translation is fraught; "lass of the hinterland" is one possibility.) According to the 1991 DVD, 'Gentleman Jim Reeves - The Story of a Legend', although Reeves could not speak Afrikaans, this was remedied by South African composer and songwriter Gilbert Gibson, who stood behind Reeves and whispered the words of the song to him, who would then sing the same words into the microphone. The song later appeared on the 33 rpm LP 'The Jim Reeves Way,' a 1965 UK 'red spot' label 12-track 'Dynagroove' Mono LP, co-produced by Chet Atkins and including two tracks sung in Afrikaans; one of which was Bolandse Nooientjie.

Around the same time, Gerry Goffin and Jack Keller wrote a doo-wop version for Tony Orlando which took considerable liberties with the original; the opening quatrain, for instance is "Beautiful Dreamer/Wake unto me/Can't you see me, baby/I'm on my bended knee." Orlando released this version as a single in 1962 and it quickly became a regular part of the Beatles' set list, from 1962 through the Beatles Winter 1963 Helen Shapiro Tour in early 1963. A recording of a 1963 Beatles performance of the song on the BBC was released in 2013 on their album On Air – Live at the BBC Volume 2. Around this same time, Rory Storm and The Hurricanes also featured the song in their live performances. This version was later recorded by Billy J. Kramer with The Dakotas.

An updated version was released in 1963 by John Leyton (with revised lyrics by Ken Lewis and John Carter).

Udo Jürgens recorded a German language version as Beautiful Dreamgirl in 1964.. Roy Orbison recorded for his album In Dreams which led to it becoming a top ten Australian single in 1964. That same year, the comedic musician Allan Sherman released a parody version of the song titled "Beautiful Teamsters," about a man who longs to become a truck driver and join the Teamsters union.

The Nutmegs recorded a soulful a capella doo wop version in 1965.

Bobby Darin recorded a bluesy version of the song with all-new lyrics at some time before his death in 1973, but it remained was unreleased until 1999, when it was featured on the album Bobby Darin: The Unreleased Capitol Sides. No attribution is given for the new lyrics; one possibility is that Darin might have written these himself. These lyrics tell about a lonely woman who dreams of a love of her own, and a lonely man who dreams of love too. The reference to a queen is retained in Darin's version, asking if the woman is a "queen without a throne".

Wolfgang Roloff aka "Ronny" (1930-2011) recorded his own German version in 1975: "Träumendes Mädchen" ("Dreaming Girl").

The song is also featured on Marty Robbins' posthumous album Long, Long Ago (1984) and by Jerry Lee Lewis on the 1988 album Rocket.

The 2004 documentary Beautiful Dreamer: Brian Wilson and the Story of Smile is named after the song, and in the documentary Brian Wilson quips that the first letters of the words "Beautiful Dreamer, Wake" compare with his own initials, Brian Douglas Wilson.

In 2007 the song was recorded by Thomas Hampson with Jay Ungar (mandolin), David Alpher (piano), and Molly Mason (guitar).

The song appears on Ray Price's posthumous farewell album Beauty Is... Ray Price, the Final Sessions (2014).

A parody folk song, "Beautiful Streamer," modifies the lyrics to describe a skydiver contemplating his fate after his parachute fails to deploy. Modern renditions and recordings of "Blood on the Risers" performed by the 82nd Airborne Division often include the first verse of "Beautiful Streamer" after the main lyrics.

=== Film ===
The song is central to the plot of the 1949 film Mighty Joe Young, as it is used throughout the film to calm the title character, a large gorilla.

In 2018, the song "Beautiful Dreamer" was used in the supernatural film Winchester. The opening lines of the song are heard during the official trailer. The lyrics are also heard throughout the movie, as a young boy begins to sing them when he has been possessed by a malicious spirit.

A cover version of "Beautiful Dreamer" with Spanish lyrics written by Rafael Jaime Zorrilla and titled Ángel Valiente (Brave Angel) was prominently featured in the final scene of the 2024 live-action Mexican independent short film Mi Hermano Lobo (My Brother Wolf). It was used as a hopeful and uplifting farewell lullaby and was performed by 13-year-old stage actor and music student Héctor Mateo García Díaz Infante in the lead role of Mowgli (in his film debut). Mowgli sings it to comfort his young protege Rafael (Jorge Luis Jiménez Avilés) before departing back to the jungle.

=== Literature ===
The song is pivotal to E. B. White's 1970 novel The Trumpet of the Swan. Louis the trumpeter swan learns the tune during his long journey to find his voice via a stolen trumpet and a chalk slate. In a climactic scene, he belts out its poetry on his trumpet at dawn, declaring his love in the Philadelphia Zoo to the beautiful swan Serena, the object of his long unrequited love. White also includes the public domain sheet music in the novel, perhaps to encourage similarly dramatic loving gestures. The song was also used in The Diviners book 2, Lair of Dreams by Libba Bray.
