= Jane McDowell Foster Wiley =

Wife of Stephen Foster

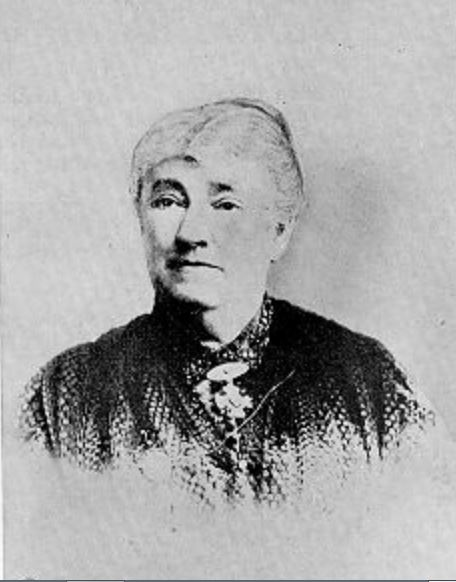
- Born: Jane Denny McDowell; December 10, 1829
- Died: January 17, 1903 (aged 73); Pittsburgh, Pennsylvania
- Resting place: Allegheny Cemetery, Pittsburgh, Allegheny County, Pennsylvania, U.S. (Plot: Section 12 Lot 14 Grave 1)
- Occupation: Telegraph operator
- Known for: Spouse of Stephen Collins Foster and M.D. Wiley
- Spouse(s): Stephen Foster (m. 1850; died 1864) Matthew D. Wiley
- Children: Marion Welch (1851–1935)

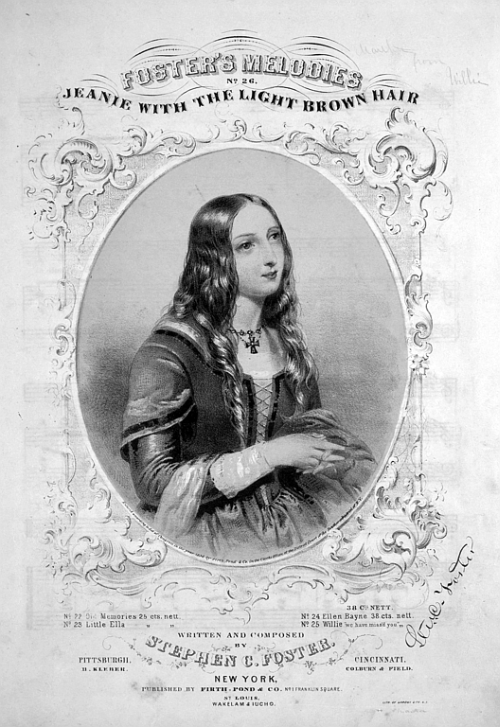
Jane is credited with being the inspiration for Stephen Foster's song "Jeanie With The Light Brown Hair", published in 1854

Jane Denny Foster Wiley (née McDowell; December 10, 1829 – January 17, 1903) was the wife of Stephen Foster and the inspiration for his song "Jeanie with the Light Brown Hair". Her archives are located in the University of Pittsburgh.

== Early life ==
Jane's father, Andrew Nathan McDowell, was a physician in Pittsburgh. He encouraged the first black medical student from Western Pennsylvania to apply to and attend Harvard Medical School. Dr. McDowell wrote a letter of recommendation for the student and even helped to pay for part of his tuition.

By the summer of 1850, Stephen Foster had begun to sell his music and had become increasingly well known. Jane has not been identified as having musical interests, talents or abilities. She was called pretty, had light brown hair and according to the custom of the time it was long and "luxuriant".

Jane McDowell married Foster on Monday, July 22, 1850, by a minister from the Trinity Episcopal Church in Chambersburg, Pennsylvania. Her wedding gown was noted to be beautiful and well-fitting. The wedding ceremony was described by Jane's sister to be quite strained, attributed to the couple's nervousness. Immediately after the wedding, the couple took an extended honeymoon to New York and Baltimore. They stopped in Paradise, Pennsylvania, Mercersburg, Pennsylvania, and Chambersburg. Jane's mother-in-law had relatives in Chambersburg and the couple visited them while they were there. Biographers speculate that the honeymoon was really a business trip to establish business arrangements with music publishers in New York and Baltimore.

== Family life ==
By September 8, 1850, the Fosters had returned to Allegheny City (now part of Pittsburgh, Pennsylvania) and moved in with Stephen's older brother, William Barclay Foster Jr. Jane's mother-in-law, father-in-law and brother-in-law, were also living in the home. Jane became pregnant and gave birth to their only child, Marion, born April 18, 1851. After the birth of Marion, they moved in with Jane's family for some months and then returned to the Foster home. This time in Jane's life has been identified as being quite difficult for her since she was used to having servants, a larger home and privacy.

Marriage problems soon developed and the Foster family initially blamed Jane for not making Stephen happy. They later changed their view of Jane and praised her for keeping the family together despite the decline in Stephen's income and his lack of responsibility. Even though marital life was difficult, some of Stephen Foster's best songs were reflective of their first years of marriage.

Jane obtained a job as a telegraph operator in Greensburg sometime after her separation from Stephen.

== Later years ==
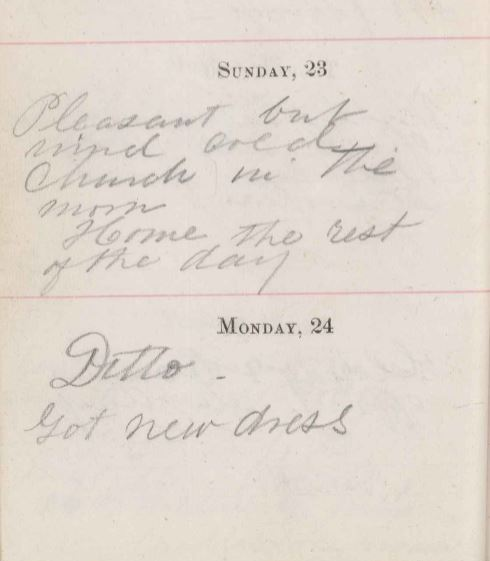
A page from Jane Foster's diary, 1871; She records that she got a new dress on Monday

Jane and Stephen were married for 14 years until his death on January 13, 1864, in New York City. They were not living together at the time and had been separated for four years—an unusual arrangement in the mid-19th century. Morrison Foster, an older brother of Stephen aided Jane and Marion after the composer's death in the arrangement of royalty payments to her from various music publishers. She married M.D. Wiley after Foster died. Jane took her granddaughter Jessie Rose Welch into her care and raised her to adulthood. Jane created very little biographical information.

Jane is remembered during the Allegheny Cemetery's "Doo-Dah Days" when visitors are given a tour past her grave.

== Biographies ==
Morris Foster destroyed correspondence that would reflect poorly on the Foster family. This included almost all references to Jane. No letters or other documents that Jane wrote to Stephen or Stephen wrote to Jane survived.

== Archives ==
Archival materials and Primary source materials, including family letters and Jane's diary, are housed in the University of Pittsburgh Library System Archives Service Center. These have been digitized and are accessible remotely.
