= William Barclay Foster =

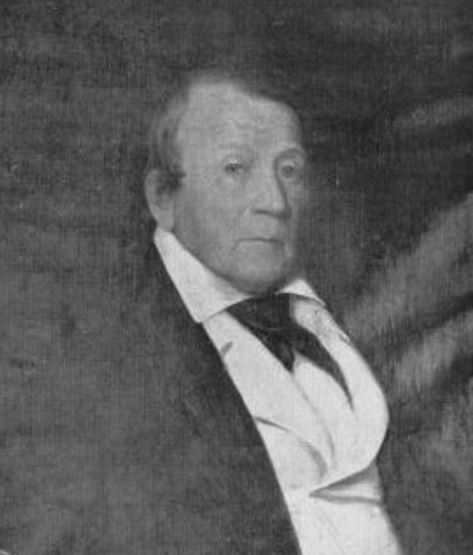
- Founder of Lawrenceville, PA, Politician, and father of Stephen Collins Foster
- Born: 7 September 1779; Berkeley County, Virginia
- Died: 27 July 1855 (aged 75); Allegheny, Pennsylvania
- Resting place: Allegheny Cemetery
- Occupations: Businessman; merchant, politician
- Known for: The father of Stephen Foster.
- Board member of: Cannonsburg Academy
- Spouse: Eliza Clayland Tomlinson (1788–1855)
- Children: Charlotte Susanna Foster (1809–1829), Anne Eliza Foster Buchanan (1812–1891), Henry Baldwin Foster (1816–1870), Henrietta Angelica Foster Thornton (1819–1879), Dunning McNair Foster (1821–1856), Morrison Foster (1823–1904), Stephen Foster (1826–1864)

William Barclay Foster (1779–1855) was the father of Stephen Foster and a notable businessman in his time. He was one of the most prosperous merchants of Pittsburgh, Pennsylvania. He was a Pennsylvania state legislator and served three terms. He was also elected mayor of Allegheny City (now part of the city of Pittsburgh) twice in his lifetime. He has been identified as a "patriot", a "lover of home" and an "outstanding servant to his community, state and government".

== Early life ==
His father, James Alexander Foster, was born into an Ulster Scots family from County Donegal in 1738 in Berkeley County, Virginia. At the end of the Revolutionary War, he and his family moved to Western Pennsylvania along with other Irish, chiefly Ulster Scotch, families. James Foster was one of the founders and original trustees of Canonsburg Academy, a school founded in 1791. William attended the academy until he was sixteen and then moved to Pittsburgh shortly after the city's incorporation along the Monongahela and Allegheny rivers. William Foster found work with the company of Denny and Bellen, "Dry Goods, Hardware, etc." He represented the company promoted to a partner, and traveled widely. He provided supplies to the US military for the war of 1812.

== Later life ==
Foster strongly maintained that the US government owed him money for serving as a commissionary agent in 1822 and 1850. He lost each case.

=== Community founder ===
He founded the community of Lawrenceville in 1814, naming it for naval hero James Lawrence. It has since been annexed as a neighborhood of Pittsburgh.

== Personal life ==
He married Eliza Clayland Tomlinson on November 14, 1807, in Chambersburg, Pennsylvania.

== Archived content ==
Primary source material including family letters, business documents, ledgers, maps of property and other of Barclay's writings are housed in the University of Pittsburgh Library System Archives Service Center. These have been digitized and are accessible remotely.
