= Hollywood Cowboy =

1937 film by Ewing Scott

- Theatrical release poster
- Directed by: Ewing Scott
- Screenplay by: Daniel Jarrett; Ewing Scott
- Produced by: George A. Hirliman
- Starring: George O'Brien; Cecilia Parker; Maude Eburne; Joe Caits; Frank Milan
- Cinematography: Frank B. Good
- Edited by: Robert O. Crandall
- Music by: Abe Meyer
- Production company: George A. Hirliman Productions
- Distributed by: RKO Pictures
- Release date: May 28, 1937
- Running time: 64 minutes
- Country: United States
- Language: English

Hollywood Cowboy is a 1937 American adventure film directed by Ewing Scott and written by Daniel Jarrett and Ewing Scott. The film stars George O'Brien, Cecilia Parker, Maude Eburne, Joe Caits and Frank Milan. The film was released on May 28, 1937, by RKO Pictures.

The film was rereleased in 1947 by Motion Picture Ventures as Wings Over Wyoming.

== Plot ==
Hollywood Western star Jeffery Carson and his sidekick Shakespeare have just recently completed outdoor shooting on a film and decide to remain in the area to do some recreational hunting. In the meantime a crime syndicate led by Doc Kramer has come up with a new scheme to make money. With a range war going on, the criminals ramp up conflict between the two sides, including murder. They form a bogus cattleman association that is actually a protection racket where ranchers will a pay a penny a pound on their cattle.

Carson and Shakespeare save the life of ranch owner Joyce Butler when gangsters rip her fence down and threaten her. Keeping their identities secret, Carson and Shakespeare sign on as ranch hands for Joyce and her mother Violet Butler. When Violet spurns Kramer's protection offer, the gangsters bomb the Butler's herd from an airplane.

== Cast ==
- George O'Brien as Jeffery Carson
- Cecilia Parker as Joyce Butler
- Maude Eburne as Violet Butler
- Joe Caits as G. Gatsby (Shakespeare) Holmes
- Frank Milan as Westbrook Courtney
- Charles Middleton as "Doc" Kramer
- Lee Shumway as Benson
- Walter De Palma as Rolfe Metzger
- Al Hill as Henchman Camby
- William Royle as Klinker
- Al Herman as Henchman Steger
- Frank Hagney as Gillie
- Dan Wolheim as Morey
- Slim Balch as Ranch hand Slim
- Sid Jordan as Ranch hand Morgan
- Lester Dorr as Joe Garvey
- Harold Daniels as Hotel Clerk

== Critical reception ==
Motion Picture Herald wrote, "Although basically the same as other western pictures, this feature manages to swerve from the path of routine by introducing metropolitan racketeering methods to the wide open spaces and then adding another touch of modernism through the use of airplanes for the climactic battle." It noted that the predominantly male preview audience "appeared to follow the plot with keen interest and took the comedy element with loud laughter."
