= Morrison Foster =

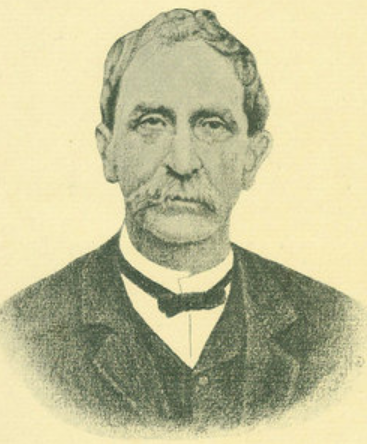
- Born: June 10, 1823; Allegheny County, Pennsylvania, U.S.
- Died: May 14, 1904 (aged 80); Grove City, Mercer County, Pennsylvania, US
- Occupations: Agent for Stephen Foster, Businessman
- Spouse(s): Jessie Lightner Foster (unknown-1882), Rebecca Shields Snowden Foster (1847 - 1929)
- Children: 3
- Parent(s): William Barclay Foster (1779–1855), Eliza Clayland Tomlinson Foster (1788–1855)

Morrison Foster (June 10, 1823 – May 14, 1904) was the older brother, business agent and biographer for Stephen Foster, a composer and lyricist of early American music. When Stephen Foster died at age 37, Morrison continued to manage Stephen's estate and acted as a mediator between music publishers and Stephen Foster's wife and daughter. Documents demonstrate his correspondence with publishers in his receipt of royalty payments on behalf of Stephen's heirs. Morrison also wrote the first biography of Stephen Foster. Morrison's daughter, Evelyn Foster Morneweck, wrote a biography about her uncle, Chronicles of Stephen Foster's Family.

== Writings ==
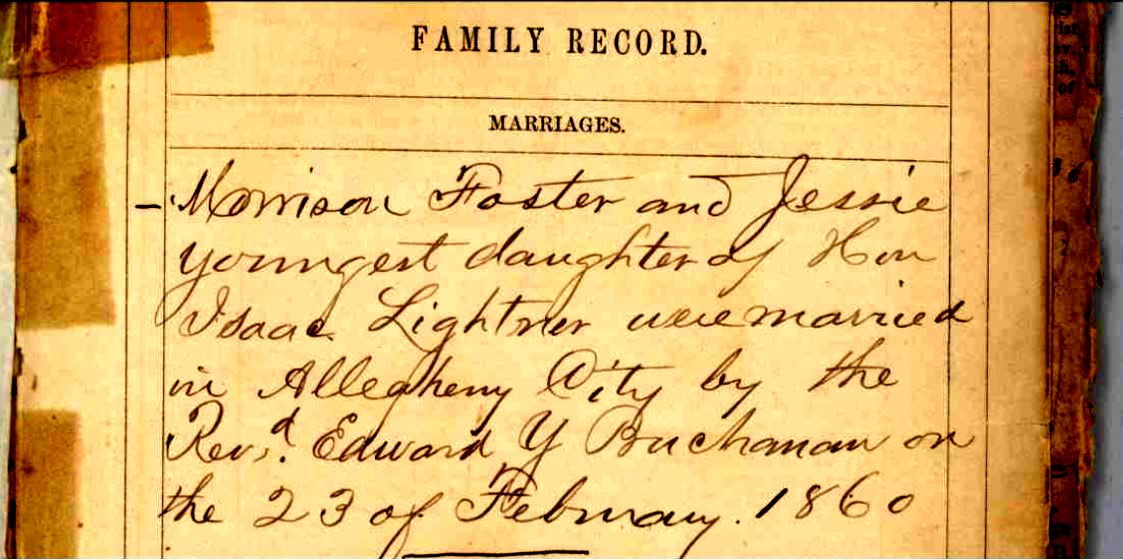
Record of Morrison Foster's Marriage from Eliza Foster's bible in 1860

In some instances, Morrison's biography conflicts with primary sources and other biographies on the life of his brother, Stephen Foster. He was selective in keeping records and correspondence that belonged to his brother, discarding items that he thought embarrassing. In his biography of Stephen he created an image of a dreamer, a naturally gifted musician, and a genius of a songwriter. He also wrote that Stephen was a devoted son to his parents. He portrayed his brother as being careless with his finances. Later biographies conflict with that of Morrison.

== Civic activity ==
Morrison Foster served on the Allegheny County Centennial Committee as Chairman in 1887.

== Archives ==
Archival documents authored by Morrison Foster are housed with the Archives Service Center, University Library System, University of Pittsburgh. Digital copies of these documents are accessible online at high resolutions and are in the public domain. Online access does not require a subscription and physical access can be scheduled for research purposes to view and examine the documents and other items in the collection.
