= Life Begins with Love =

1937 film by Ray McCarey

- Directed by: Ray McCarey
- Starring: Jean Parker; Douglass Montgomery; Edith Fellows
- Cinematography: Lucien Ballard
- Edited by: Viola Lawrence
- Music by: Morris Stoloff
- Distributed by: Columbia Pictures
- Release date: October 7, 1937
- Running time: 72 minutes
- Country: United States
- Language: English

Life Begins with Love is a 1937 American romantic drama film, directed by Ray McCarey. It stars Jean Parker, Douglass Montgomery, and Edith Fellows.
