= I Dream of Jeanie (film) =

1952 film by Allan Dwan

- Film poster
- Directed by: Allan Dwan
- Written by: Alan Le May (screenplay)
- Starring: Bill Shirley; Muriel Lawrence; Ray Middleton; Lynn Bari
- Cinematography: Reggie Lanning
- Edited by: Fred Allen
- Music by: Robert Armbruster
- Production company: Republic Pictures
- Distributed by: Republic Pictures
- Release dates: June 4, 1952 (Pittsburgh); June 25, 1952 (New York)
- Running time: 90 minutes
- Country: United States
- Language: English
- Budget: $576,083

I Dream of Jeanie is a 1952 American Trucolor historical musical film directed by Allan Dwan and starring Ray Middleton, Bill Shirley and Muriel Lawrence. The screenplay is based on the songs and life of Stephen Foster, who wrote the 1854 song "Jeanie with the Light Brown Hair", the source of the film's title.

== Plot ==
In 1849, the song "Oh! Susanna" is a nationwide hit, but its author, bookkeeper Stephen Foster, has given his work to several music houses free of charge and without credit. His refined true love Inez McDowell, a classically trained singer, despises popular music, especially Foster's songs. His world changes when Edwin P. Christy educates him about the music business and launches his career as the author of the songs that the Christy Minstrels perform in their shows.

== Cast ==
- Ray Middleton as Edwin P. Christy
- Bill Shirley as Stephen Foster
- Muriel Lawrence as Inez McDowell
- Eileen Christy as Jeanie McDowell
- Rex Allen as Mr Tambo / Rex Allen / Narrator
- Lynn Bari as Mrs. McDowell
- Dick Simmons as Dunning Foster
- Scott Elliott as Milford Wilson
- Andrew Tombes as R.E. Howard
- James Dobson as Spike
- Percy Helton as Mr. Horker
- Glen Turnbull as Glenn Turnbull / Speciality Dancer
- Louise Beavers as Mammy
- James Kirkwood as Doctor
- Carl "Alfalfa" Switzer as Freddie
- Fred Moultrie as Chitlin

== Soundtrack ==
All songs written by Stephen Foster unless otherwise indicated:

- "Oh! Susanna"
- "Jeanie with the Light Brown Hair"
- "On Wings of Song" (written by Felix Mendelssohn-Bartholdy)
- "Lo, Hear the Gentle Lark" (music by H.R. Bishop, words by William Shakespeare from Venus and Adonis)
- "Nelly Bly"
- "My Old Kentucky Home, Good Night"
- "Ring de Banjo"
- "Old Folks at Home (Swanee River)"
- "Beautiful Dreamer"
- "Come Where My Love Lies Dreaming"
- "Gwine to Rune All Night (De Camptown Races)"
- "Queen of Mirth"
- "Haunting My Dreams at Night"
- "You Must Wear a Dainty Ribbon in Your Hair"
- "Old Black Joe"
- "Glendy Burke"
- "I Can Still See Her in My Dreams"
- "Old Dog Tray"

== Release ==
The world premiere of I Dream of Jeanie was held at the Fulton Theatre in Pittsburgh, Pennsylvania on June 4, 1952, with the film's stars in attendance. The event was part of the city's Welcome Week celebration and was preceded by a minstrel show on a Dravo barge featuring 50 performers.

== Reception ==
In a contemporary review for The New York Times, critic Oscar Godbout wrote:

[T]he music, with its universal appeal, was not enough for the creators of this bogus biography; the author of the script, Alan LeMay, with the director, Allan Dwan, succumbed to an urge to skewer the tunes with a vapid tale of the young musician being thwarted in love. They show him as a shallow, brainless bookkeeper who tinkered with tunes when he wasn't debasing himself before a supercilious Southern belle who would have him only if he stopped writing songs. That's the Stephen Foster Bill Shirley is forced to portray. ... But the songs are appealing and Mr. Middleton's portrayal of a famous minstrel compensates for much of the dullness.
