= Old Black Joe =

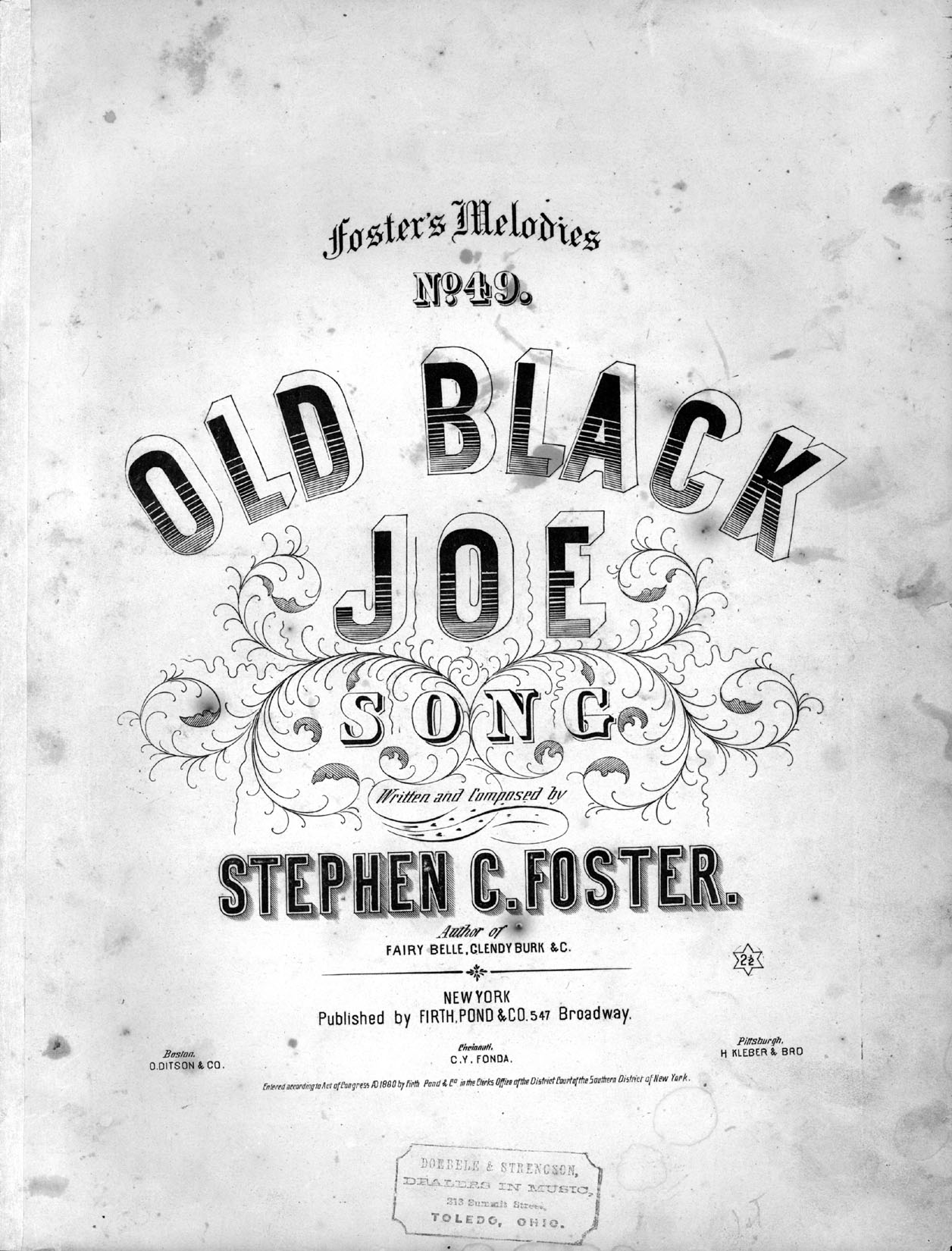
- Original sheet music cover

Song
- Published: 1860
- Genre: Parlor song, minstrel
- Songwriter: Stephen Foster

"Old Black Joe" is a parlor song by Stephen Foster (1826–1864). It was published by Firth, Pond & Co. of New York in 1860. Ken Emerson, author of the book Doo-dah!: Stephen Foster And The Rise Of American Popular Culture (1998), indicates that Foster's fictional Joe was inspired by a servant in the home of Foster's father-in-law, Dr. McDowell of Pittsburgh. The song is not written in dialect.

Emerson believes that the song's "soft melancholy" and its "elusive undertone" (rather than anything musical), brings the song closest to traditional African-American spirituals.

Harold Vincent Milligan describes the song as "one of the best of the Ethiopian [contemporary parlance for blackface minstrel songs] songs ... its mood is one of gentle melancholy, of sorrow without bitterness. There is a wistful tenderness in the music." Jim Kweskin covered the song on his 1971 album Jim Kweskin's America.

The song has sometimes been recorded as "Poor Old Joe", including by Paul Robeson who recorded it several times, for example in 1928 and 1930. Other notable recordings were by Bing Crosby (recorded June 16, 1941), Jerry Lee Lewis (1959) and Al Jolson (recorded July 13, 1950).

== Lyrics ==
A 1916 recording sung by Alma Gluck

1.
Gone are the days when my heart was young and gay,
Gone are my friends from the cotton fields away,
Gone from the earth to a better land I know,
I hear their gentle voices calling "Old Black Joe".
Chorus
I'm coming, I'm coming, for my head is bending low;
I hear those gentle voices calling, "Old Black Joe".

2.
Why do I weep when my heart should feel no pain?
Why do I sigh that my friends come not again,
Grieving for forms now departed long ago?
I hear their gentle voices calling "Old Black Joe".
Chorus

3.
Where are the hearts once so happy and so free?
The children so dear that I held upon my knee,
Gone to the shore where my soul has longed to go.
I hear their gentle voices calling "Old Black Joe".
Chorus

== Adaptations ==
- Thomas Dixon, Jr.'s one-act play Old Black Joe was produced in New York in 1912.
- Roy Harris made a choral adaptation of the song: Old Black Joe, A Free Paraphrase for full chorus of mixed voices a capella (1938).
- In July 1926, Fleischer Studios released a short cartoon of the song in the Song Car-Tunes series, made in the DeForest Phonofilm sound-on-film process.
- The first line of the Chorus lyrics is sung by Bugs Bunny in the 1953 Looney Tunes cartoon "Southern Fried Rabbit".
- Jerry Lee Lewis version with Gene Lowery Singers released in 1960.
- In a 1973 episode of the TV sitcom Maude the character of Walter Findlay repeatedly plays the song on an electric organ.
- In a 2000 episode of the TV sitcom Strangers with Candy a student sings and plays acoustic guitar. Season 2, Episode 6, "Hit and Run".
- In the 1991 Palme d'Or winner Barton Fink, the character of W. P. Mayhew drunkenly performs Foster's song.
- In the 2021 TV series Them, this song is sung in the pilot episode by multiple characters, and again in the fifth episode.
- The tune was used for the introduction of part of Phillip Sparke's "Dundonnell", a movement from his work "Hymn of the Highlands."
