= Five and Ten (1931 film) =

1931 American romantic drama film

- Theatrical release poster
- Directed by: Robert Z. Leonard
- Written by: A. P. Younger; Edith Fitzgerald
- Based on: Five and Ten; 1929 novel by Fannie Hurst
- Produced by: Marion Davies; Robert Z. Leonard
- Starring: Marion Davies; Leslie Howard; Irene Rich
- Cinematography: George Barnes
- Edited by: Margaret Booth
- Production companies: Cosmopolitan Productions; Metro-Goldwyn-Mayer
- Distributed by: Loew's Inc.
- Release date: June 13, 1931
- Running time: 89 minutes
- Country: United States
- Language: English

Five and Ten is a 1931 American pre-Code romantic drama film directed by an uncredited Robert Z. Leonard and starring Marion Davies, Leslie Howard and Irene Rich. Davies plays as an heiress and Howard the man she loves, though he marries someone else. The film was produced by William Randolph Hearst's Cosmopolitan Productions in partnership with Metro-Goldwyn-Mayer. It is based on the 1929 Fannie Hurst novel of the same name.

== Plot ==
The wealthy John G. Rarick has made a huge success of a chain of five and ten cent stores and decides to move his family, including his daughter Jennifer, from Kansas City to New York. Jennifer is delighted to move amongst the social elite but faces snobbishness because of her background. She becomes very attracted to a man she encounters, an aspiring architect Berry Rhodes but he is already engaged to another woman who despises Jennifer.

== Cast ==
- Marion Davies as Jennifer Rarick
- Leslie Howard as Berry Rhodes
- Richard Bennett as John G. Rarick
- Irene Rich as Jenny Rarick
- Douglass Montgomery as Avery Rarick
- Mary Duncan as Muriel Preston
- Lee Beranger as Leslie (uncredited)
- Theodore Von Eltz as Ramon (uncredited)
- George Irving as Mr. Brooks (uncredited)
- Halliwell Hobbes as Hopkins (uncredited)
- Charles Giblyn as Dennison (uncredited)
- Henry Armetta as Taxi Driver (uncredited)
- Ruth Selwyn as Midge (uncredited)

== Bibliography ==
- Gabrielle, Lara. Captain of Her Soul: The Life of Marion Davies. University of California Press, 2022.
- Pizzitola, Louis. Hearst Over Hollywood: Power, Passion, and Propaganda in the Movies. Columbia University Press, 2002.
