= Al Herman (vaudeville) =

American performer (1885/87–1967)

Al Herman (born Alexander Himan; February 25, 1885 or 1887 – July 2, 1967) was an American vaudeville performer and actor.

He was born in Scotland to Joseph Himan, of Russian origin, and his English wife Mary. Official sources give both 1885 and 1887 as his birth year. The family emigrated to the United States when Alexander was a baby, and settled in Jackson, Missouri.

By the 1910s he was established on the vaudeville circuit and was billed as "The Assassin of Grief and Remorse". He regularly performed in blackface, and used a cigar as a prop. In Portland, Oregon, in 1917, he was described as "a monologist of the impromptu sort and a talented singer. His material is extolled as being good, live, bright and breezy and he has a personality all his own making him a sure-fire applause-winner." In 1921, he appeared on stage in the Greenwich Village Follies.

He directed several silent film shorts in the 1920s, including Little Red Riding Hood and Little Miss Hollywood, both starring Baby Peggy. In 1926, he appeared in an early Lee de Forest Phonofilm. From the early 1930s, he started a film career as an actor in Hollywood, often in uncredited bit parts including a role as a reporter in Mr. Deeds Goes to Town (1936). He had credited roles in Harmony Lane (1935), Hollywood Cowboy (1937), Studio Romance (1937), Paid to Dance (1937), Oklahoma Renegades (1940), and the Broadway Brevities short Minstrel Days (1941). He continued to appear in Hollywood movies until the early 1950s.

He died in Los Angeles in 1967 at the age of about 80.
