= Douglass Montgomery =

American actor (1909–1966)

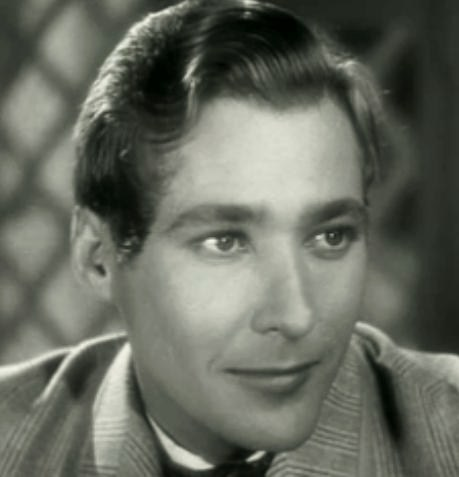
- Montgomery in Harmony Lane (1935)
- Born: Robert Douglass Montgomery; October 29, 1909; Los Angeles, California, U.S.
- Died: July 23, 1966 (aged 56); Norwalk, Connecticut, U.S.
- Other names: Kent Douglas
- Years active: 1926–1957
- Spouse: Kay Young (m. 1952)

Robert Douglass Montgomery (also credited as Kent Douglass; October 29, 1909 – July 23, 1966) was an American actor.

== Early years ==
The son of Chester Montgomery, a jeweler, and Leona Smith, Montgomery graduated from Los Angeles High School.

== Career ==
Montgomery used the stage name Douglass Montgomery when he began acting in New York. He gained early acting experience at the Pasadena Community Playhouse.

The film phase of his career began at M-G-M in 1930, playing the second male lead in films such as Paid and Five and Ten. When he signed his contract at the studio his name was changed to Kent Douglass, to avoid confusion with that studio's star Robert Montgomery. Upon leaving MGM in 1932, he changed it back to Douglass Montgomery.

Among his most celebrated roles was Laurie in Little Women (1933), opposite Katharine Hepburn's Jo March. He also played Johnny Hollis ("Johnny-in-the-Clouds") in The Way to the Stars (1945).

After serving in the Royal Canadian Air Force during World War II, Montgomery moved to Great Britain and made films there. He later returned to the U.S. and appeared in a number of television shows.

== Marriage ==
Montgomery married British actress Kay Young (born Kathleen Tamar Young) on March 14, 1952, at Bethlehem Federated Church. He was her second husband. Young had divorced film actor Michael Wilding the year before she wed Montgomery. (Wilding remarried in 1952, to Hollywood star Elizabeth Taylor.) Young and Montgomery remained married until his death.

== Death ==
Douglass Montgomery died of spinal cancer in Norwalk, Connecticut, at age 56, on July 23, 1966. He was cremated, with his ashes given to his widow.

== Filmography ==
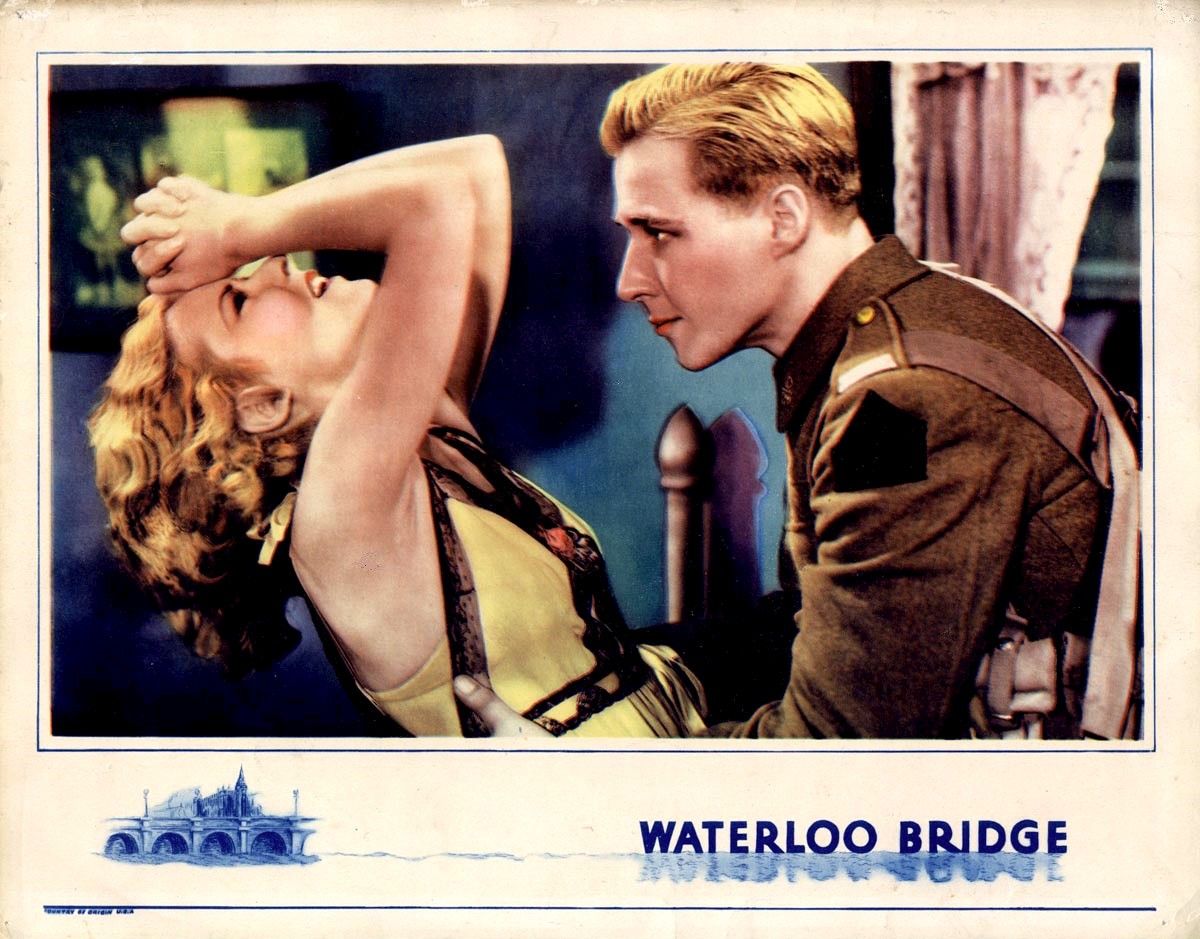
Mae Clarke and Montgomery in Waterloo Bridge (1931)

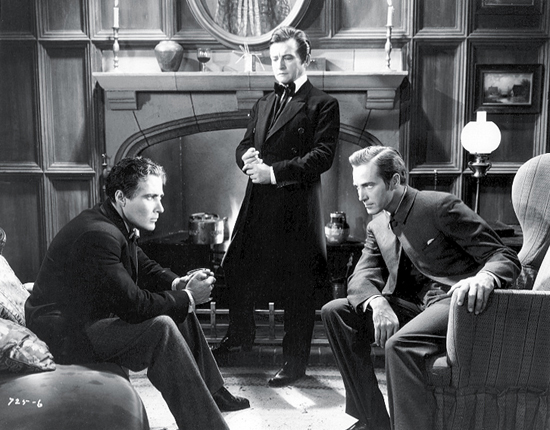
Montgomery, Claude Rains and David Manners in The Mystery of Edwin Drood (1935)

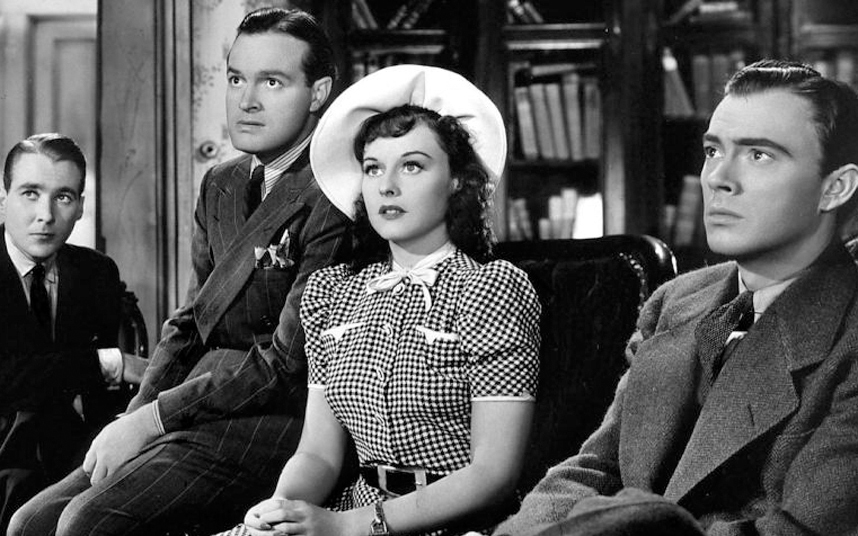
Montgomery, Bob Hope, Paulette Goddard and John Beal in The Cat and the Canary (1939)

- Paid (1930) UK title: Within the Law as Bob (credited as Kent Douglass)
- Daybreak (1931) as Von Lear
- Five and Ten (1931) as Avery Rarick (credited as Kent Douglass)
- Waterloo Bridge (1931) as Roy Cronin (credited as Kent Douglass)
- A House Divided (1931) as Matt Law
- Little Women (1933) as Theodore "Laurie" Laurence
- Eight Girls in a Boat (1934) as David Perrin
- Little Man, What Now? (1934) as Hans Pinneberg
- Music in the Air (1934) as Karl Roder
- The Mystery of Edwin Drood (1935) as Neville Landless
- Lady Tubbs (1935) as Phil Ash-Orcutt
- Harmony Lane (1935) as Stephen Foster
- Everything Is Thunder (1936) as Hugh McGrath
- Tropical Trouble (1936) as George Masterman
- Life Begins with Love (1937) as William Addington Drake IV
- Counsel for Crime (1937) as Paul Maddox
- The Cat and the Canary (1939) as Charlie Wilder
- The Way to the Stars UK (1945) (US title Johnny in the Clouds)
- Woman to Woman UK (1947) as David Anson
- Fatal Symphony Italy (1947) (When in Rome) as John Savage
- Forbidden UK (1949) as Jim Harding

== Television appearances ==
- Hallmark Hall of Fame (1951)
- Cameo Theatre (1952) - Peer Gynt
- Robert Montgomery Presents (1952)
- Kraft Television Theater (1954)
