= Jeanie with the Light Brown Hair =

Parlor song by Stephen Foster

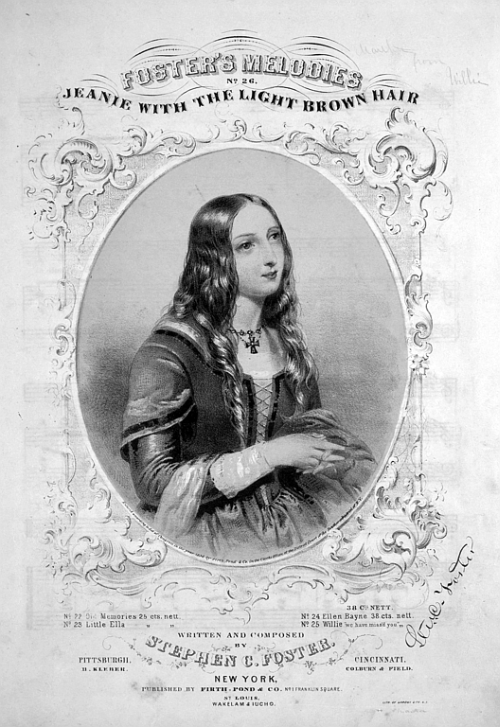
- Original sheet music cover

Song
- Published: 1854
- Genre: Parlor song
- Songwriter: Stephen Foster

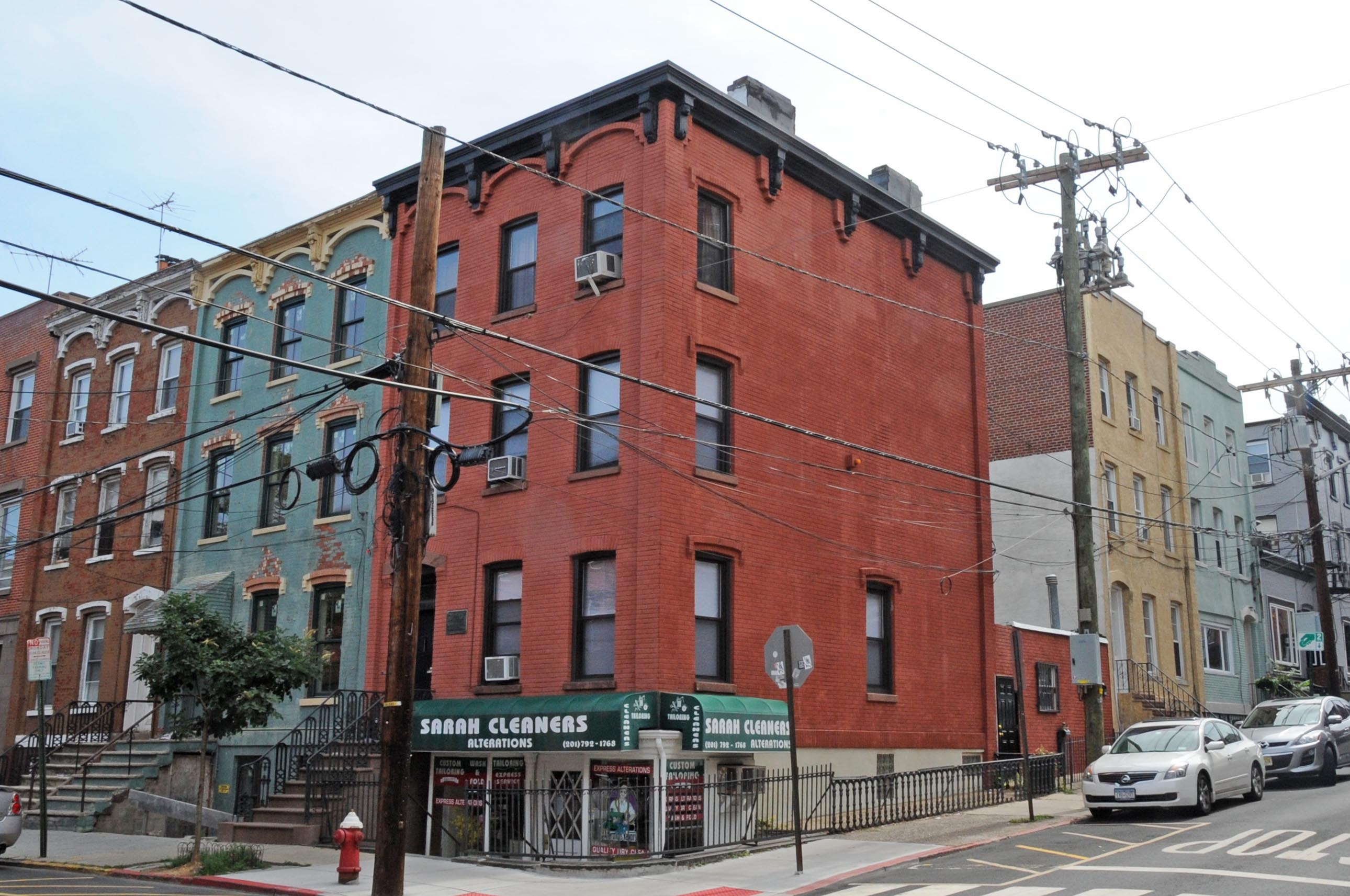
House in Hoboken, New Jersey where Foster composed Jeanie with the Light Brown Hair

"Jeanie with the Light Brown Hair" is a parlor song by Stephen Foster (1826–1864), published by Firth, Pond & Co. of New York in 1854. Foster wrote the song with his estranged wife Jane McDowell in mind. The lyrics allude to a permanent separation.

"Jeanie" was a notorious beneficiary of the ASCAP boycott of 1941, a dispute caused by ASCAP increasing its licensing fees. During this period, radio broadcasters played only public-domain music or songs licensed by ASCAP rival BMI. According to a 1941 article in Time magazine, "So often had BMI's Jeannie [sic] With the Light Brown Hair been played that she was widely reported to have turned grey."

== Lyrics ==
I dream of Jeanie with the light brown hair,
Borne, like a vapor on the summer air;
I see her tripping where the bright streams play,
Happy as the daisies that dance on her way.
Many were the wild notes her merry voice would pour.
Many were the blithe birds that warbled them o'er:
Oh, I dream of Jeanie with the light brown hair,
Floating, like a vapor, on the soft summer air.

I long for Jeanie with a day-dawn smile,
Radiant in gladness, warm with winning guile;
I hear her melodies, like joys gone by,
Sighing round my heart over the fond hopes that die:—
Sighing like the night wind and sobbing like the rain,—
Wailing for the lost one that comes not again:
Oh, I long for Jeanie, and my heart bows low,
Never more to find her where the bright waters flow.

I sigh for Jeanie, but her light form strayed
Far from the fond hearts round her native glade;
Her smiles have vanished and her sweet songs flown,
Flitting like the dreams that have cheered us and gone.
Now the nodding wild flowers may wither on the shore
While her gentle fingers will cull them no more:
Oh, I sigh for Jeanie with the light brown hair,
Floating, like a vapor, on the soft summer air.

== Other versions ==
Bing Crosby recorded the song on March 22, 1940, for Decca Records with John Scott Trotter and His Orchestra.

Violinist Jascha Heifetz transcribed the song for the violin and it became a signature piece for him for years. The transcription has been performed by many subsequent violinists.

Sam Cooke recorded a cover of the song for his 1961 album Swing Low.

Actor Eugene Levy sang an excerpt of the song during the “Auditions” sequence of the 1996 film Waiting for Guffman.

Swedish singer Stina Nordenstam included a cover of the song in her album People are Strange.

== In popular culture ==
The opening line was notably used as the basis for the title of the 1960s TV series I Dream of Jeannie.

In the 1940 film Beyond Tomorrow the character Jimmy Houston (Richard Carlson) sings the entire song during a Christmas dinner with a band accompaniment.

Actress Rhonda Fleming as Madeline Danzeeger while playing a piano croons the opening verse in the 1950 Western film The Eagle and the Hawk. It was featured as a recurring musical theme throughout the Western film Arizona.

The song was referenced in the Warner Bros. Merrie Melodies and Looney Tunes cartoons many times throughout their original run, usually as a pun made by the character Bugs Bunny ("hare" for "hair") or in rare cases, an actual genie. One example includes the 1942 short Foney Fables: When the narrator tells the story of Aladdin, the title character is heard singing the song while rubbing the lamp. In the 1956 short Broom-Stick Bunny, a play on the title is used in the closing lines: "Hello, air-raid headquarters? Well, you're not gonna believe this, but I just saw a genie with light brown hair chasing a flying sorceress." In the 1957 short Ali Baba Bunny, Bugs disguises himself as a genie in a bottle and says "Me genie, the light brown hare."

Episode 12 of the first season of The Phil Silvers Show, title "The Singing Contest" involves his platoon very badly singing the same song throughout the show but a private (Bob Dixon as Pvt. Claude Brubaker) in the platoon who has an excellent singing voice saves their chances to win and they all end up in Florida for the Army finals.

A one-off criminal boss character named Big Louie sings the song in 1963 The Many Loves of Dobie Gillis episode "All Right, Dobie, Drop the Gun."

In an episode of the 2001 miniseries Band of Brothers, "Bastogne", a few lines of the song's first stanza are sung loudly a cappella by soldiers Joseph Liebgott, James Alley, and an unnamed soldier as they occupy a foxhole shortly before being shelled by Nazi artillery.

In the 1968 John Cassavetes film Faces, an important scene occurs which revolves around the singing of this song.

The full title is used as the nickname for character Jeanie in Studio 60 on the Sunset Strip, most notably several times in the 2006 episode "The Cold Open".

A 1966 cartoon from The Pink Panther Show is entitled Genie with the Light Pink Fur; it is about a magic lamp that turns the Pink Panther into a genie.

The opening line of the song is heard on a parlor piano in the 1998 television movie, The Love Letter.

A variation of the title is used for Ellen Conford's "Genie with the Light Blue Hair".

The song is included on the 1998 Prima Voce album Songs and Ballads by Richard Crooks.

The song figures prominently in an episode of the Old Time Radio show Quiet, Please titled "And Jeannie Dreams of Me" which aired October 17, 1948. The episode uses the song throughout and its title is a reversal of the song title which acts as a foreshadowing to the theme of the episode.

An episode of The Chipmunks features the song, as Dave Seville sings it for his girlfriend, Jeannie. The Chipmunks then sing a parody of the song, "Jeannie with the Green-Purple Hair".
