= Archives Service Center =

Archive center of the University of Pittsburgh

Archives Service Center, University Library System, University of Pittsburgh
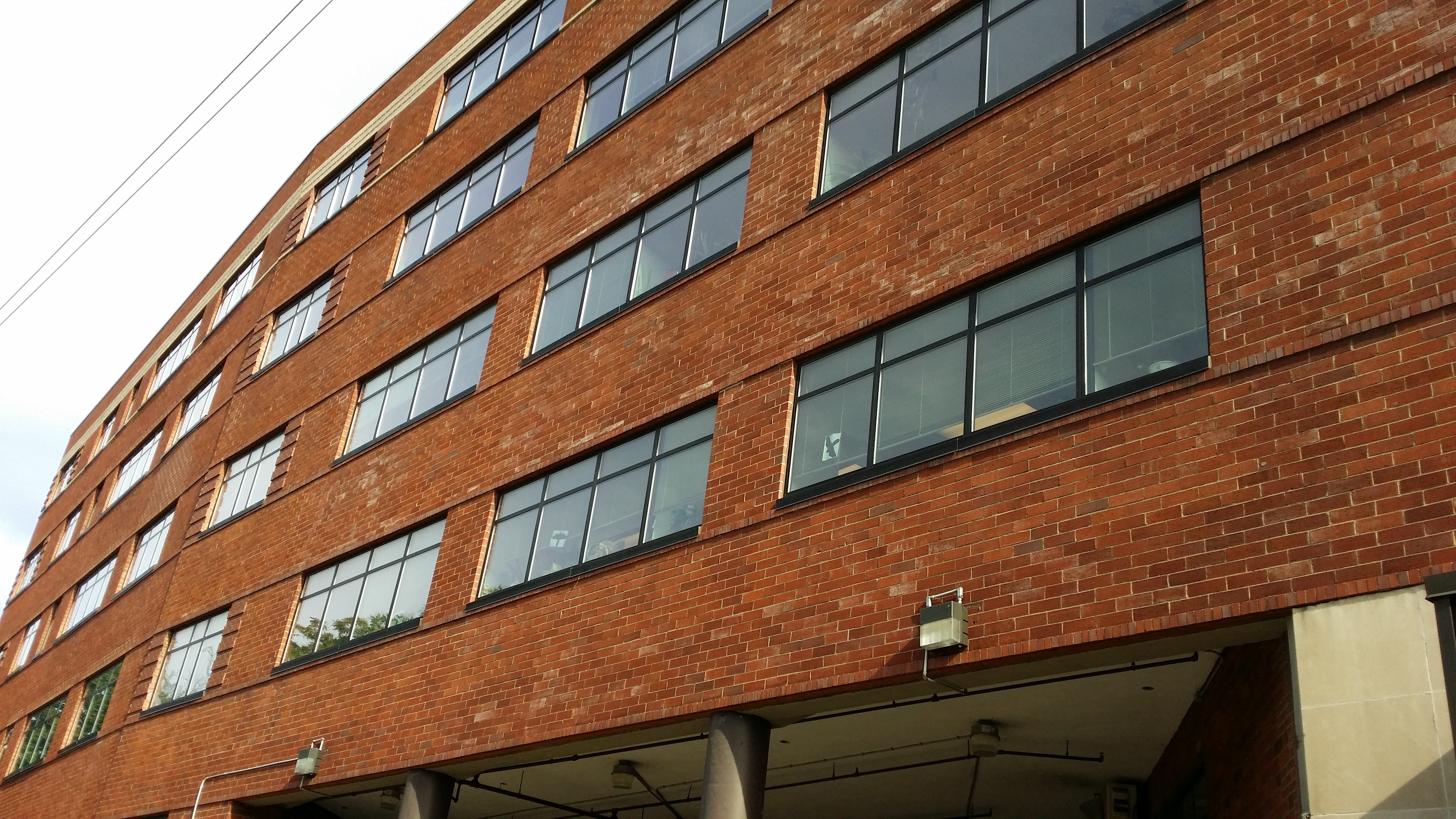
- 40.4499°N 79.8952°W
- Location: 7500 Thomas Boulevard, Pittsburgh, PA 15208 United States 412-648-3232, United States
- Type: archives and collections
- Branch of: The University of Pittsburgh Library System

Access and use
- Access requirements: none; handicap accessible, requesting access prior to visiting is recommended; restrictions apply to what can be brought into the reading room
- Population served: digital collections are accessible globally; archive contents are open to the public

Other information
- Website: http://www.library.pitt.edu/archives-service-center

The Archives Service Center (ASC) is one of the main repositories within the University Library System at the University of Pittsburgh and houses collections of various manuscripts, media, maps, and other materials of historical, social, and scientific content. It houses and functions as the repository for collections that document and describe the history of the Western Pennsylvania region, Allegheny County, Pennsylvania, the city of Pittsburgh, and the University of Pittsburgh.

== Overview ==
Some of the history of Pittsburgh and the western Pennsylvania region has been documented by primary sources such as manuscripts, books, maps, personal diaries, audio recordings, photographs, and other materials from the past. The ASC collects material related to the history of this region. The holdings in the collections span over a hundred years, primarily from the mid-19th century to the late 20th century. Some of the content is digitized and accessible online. Content published before 1923 is in the public domain, or the rights belong to the university.

== Major collections ==
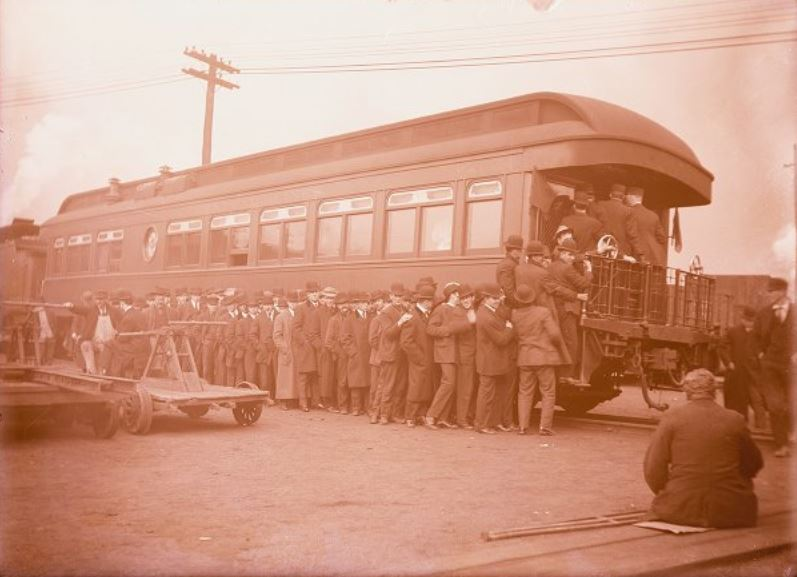
View of men in line at the pay car of the Pittsburgh and Lake Erie Railroad Company

Some of ASC's major collections include:

- Labor
- University Archives
- Audio-visual Materials
- Politics and Local Politics
- 20th Century Urban Renewable
- Women's History
- Business and Industry
- Social Action
- Ethnic Groups in Pittsburgh
- Civil Rights

== Usage ==
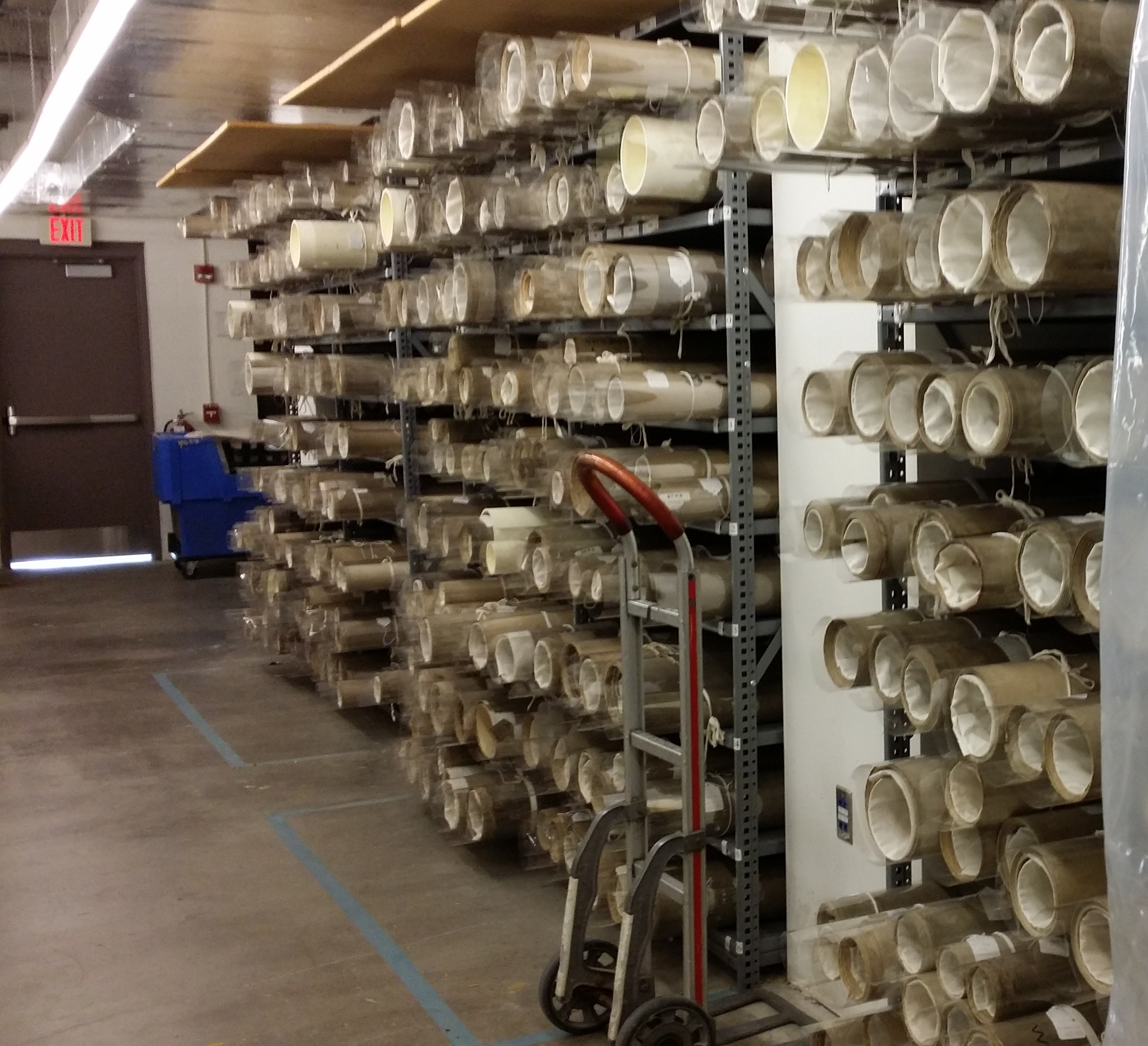
Coal mine maps stored in the University of Pittsburgh archives

Often, when the estate of a notable person dies, the family donates historical documents, physical objects, photographs, and other materials that they wish to have preserved. One such donation consisted of the mining maps of Western Pennsylvania.

Many of the coal mining companies are no longer in business and have closed or sold coal mines in the Western Pennsylvania region. These maps were determined to be of historical value and are now housed in the archives. Individuals and organizations that research drilling, 'fracking', and the foundations of buildings, roadways, and other structures often visit the ASC to examine the maps to establish the safety and accuracy of their projects.

The ASC received canvas maps charting the existence, location, and status of working coal mines and closed mines. These maps, some as long as 10 meters, are stored in a climate-controlled section of the archives.

The Archive Service Center has worked to add content from its collections to Wikipedia.
