= Washington Memorial Chapel =

Historic church in Pennsylvania, United States

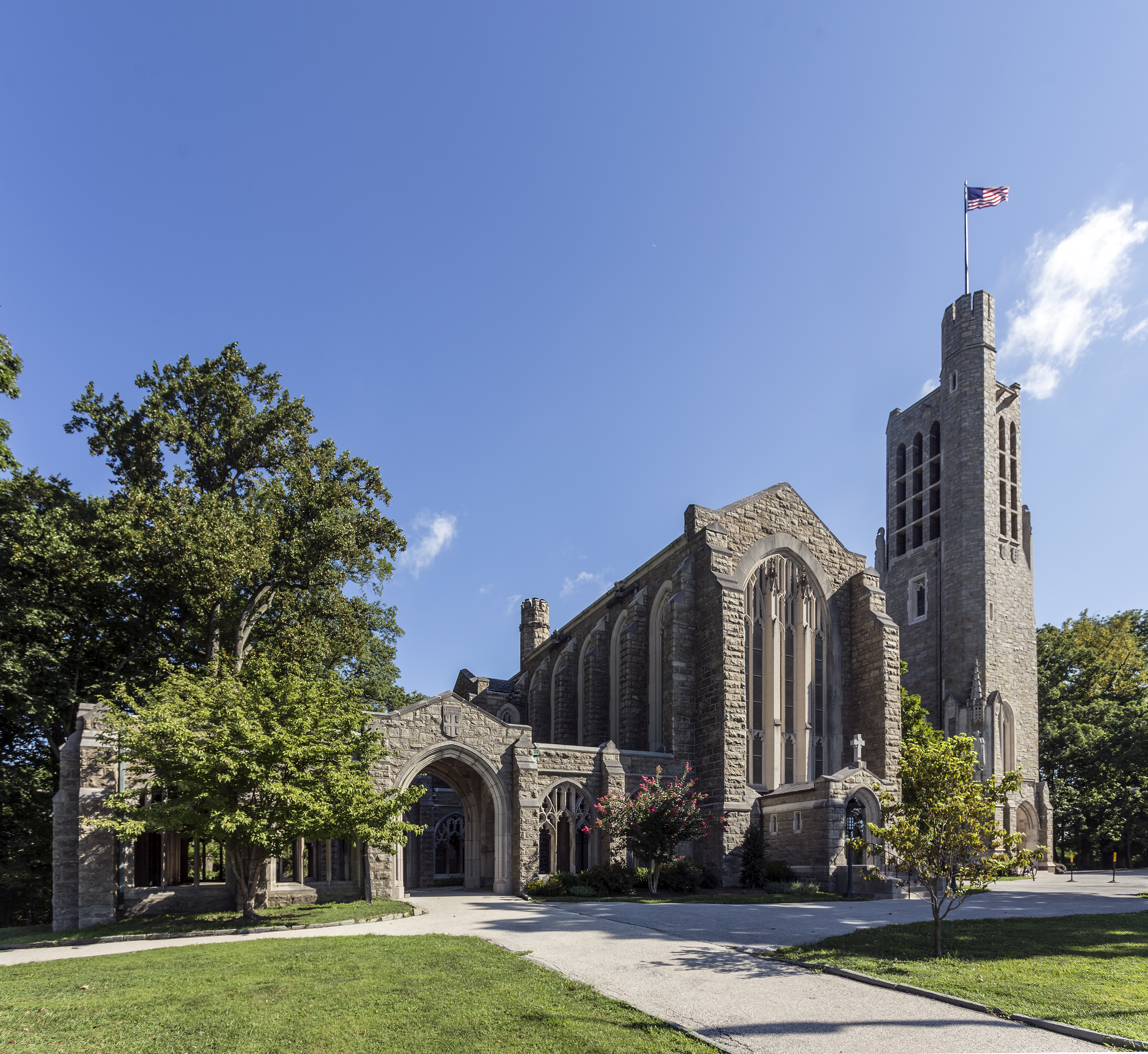
- The building in 2016

- Location within Pennsylvania Washington Memorial Chapel (the United States)
- 40°06′16.3″N 75°26′16.6″W
- Location: Montgomery, Pennsylvania
- Country: United States
- Denomination: Episcopalian
- Website: wmchapel.org

History
- Founded: 1903
- Dedication: 1904

Administration
- Archdiocese: Province III
- Diocese: Pennsylvania

Washington Memorial Chapel is a national memorial dedicated to General George Washington in Valley Forge National Historical Park, and an active Episcopal parish in Upper Merion Township.

The church was inspired by a 1904 sermon preached by the Reverend Dr. W. Herbert Burk, founder and first rector of the parish. The building was designed by architect Milton B. Medary, with stained glass windows, church furniture, ironwork, sculpture and mosaics by some of the most accomplished artisans of the early twentieth century. The chapel was listed on the National Register of Historic Places on May 1, 2017, and is currently undergoing an active restoration campaign.

The church reported 175 members in 2015 and 281 members in 2023; no membership statistics were reported in 2024 parochial reports. Plate and pledge income reported for the congregation in 2024 was $960,961. Average Sunday attendance (ASA) in 2024 was 142 persons.

== History ==
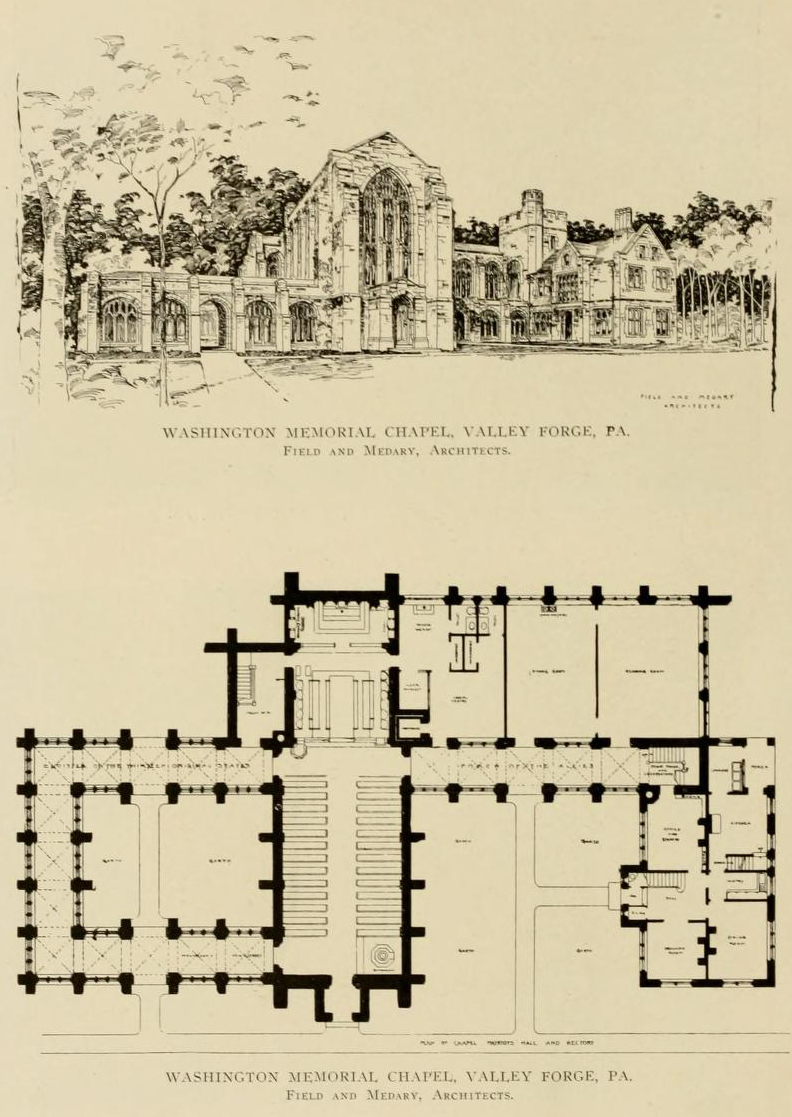
Medary's original plan (1908)

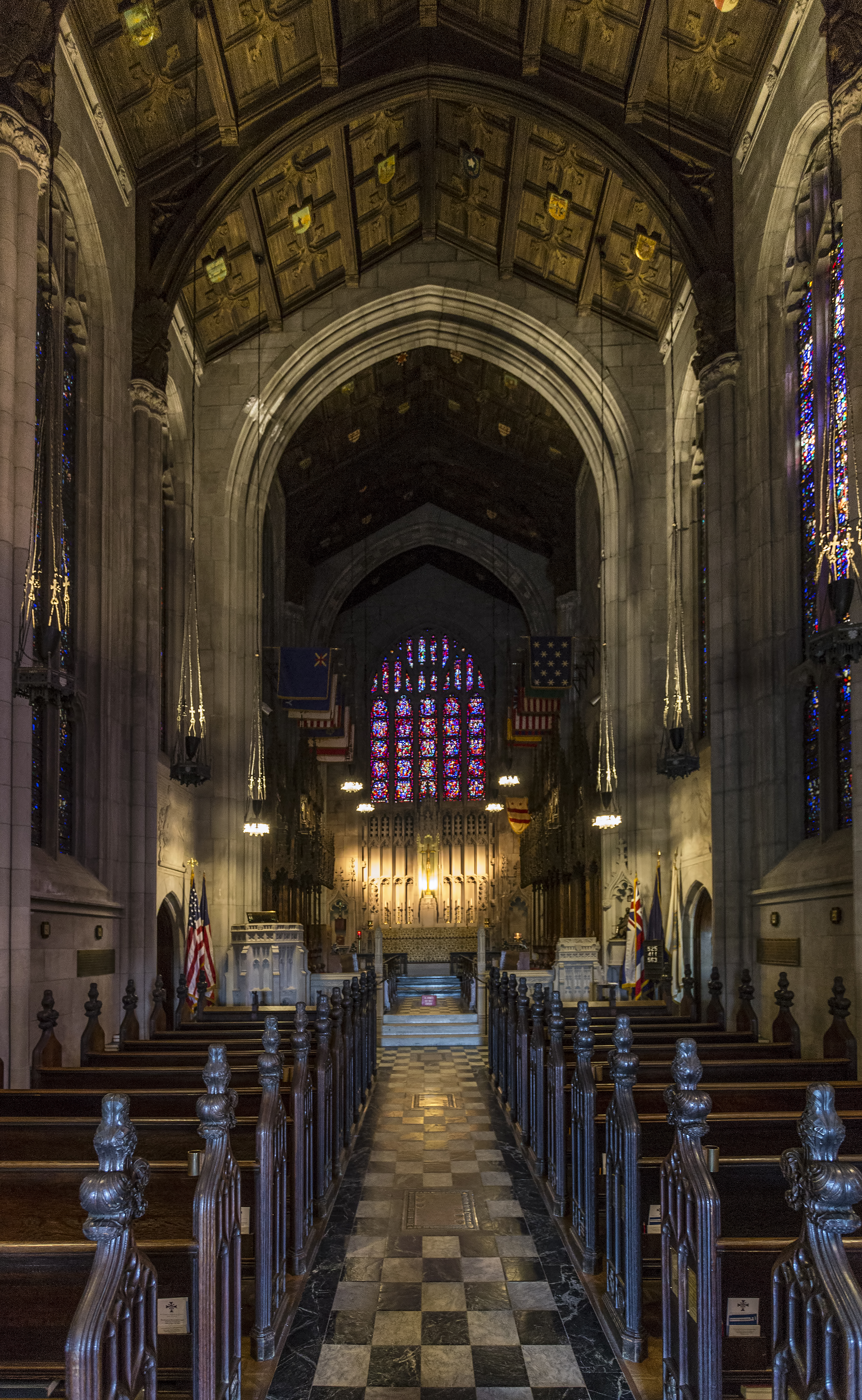
Interior in 2016

A prior attempt to build a memorial church at Valley Forge had been launched in 1885 by Baptist minister James M. Guthrie, who raised funds and began building before running out of funds.

Reverend Burk was rector of an Episcopal church in nearby Norristown. The money for the chapel was raised in small increments, and its stone walls were built a "few feet at a time." Burk was active in preserving the grounds of the 1777–78 Valley Forge winter encampment, and in establishing the Valley Forge Museum of American History, predecessor to the Valley Forge Historical Society.

June 19, 1903 marked the 125th anniversary of the evacuation of the Continental Army from Valley Forge, and the cornerstone was laid on property donated by the I. Heston Todd family. A small wood-framed building nearby preceded the present structure. President Theodore Roosevelt visited the site and gave an address in 1904, and the original wooden building was named the Theodore Roosevelt Chapel. It was demolished after completion of the present chapel.

The chapel's exterior was completed in 1917 and its interior in 1921. It serves as a wayside chapel to those who visit Valley Forge National Historical Park, and is open to the public.

Noted ironsmith Samuel Yellin produced the wrought iron gates, hardware, and locks. He was one of many artisans to produce sculptures, stonework, stained glass, and metal work. The interior woodwork was supplied by cabinetmaker Edward Maene (1852–1931).

The chapel can appear to visitors to be a part of the park, given its central location. However, the chapel and surrounding property belong to the Episcopal Church. There is a model of the Washington Monument across from the Chapel which marks the grave of Lieutenant John Waterman. The Bell Tower houses the DAR Patriot Rolls, listing those that served in the Revolutionary War.

== National Patriots Bell Tower and Carillon ==
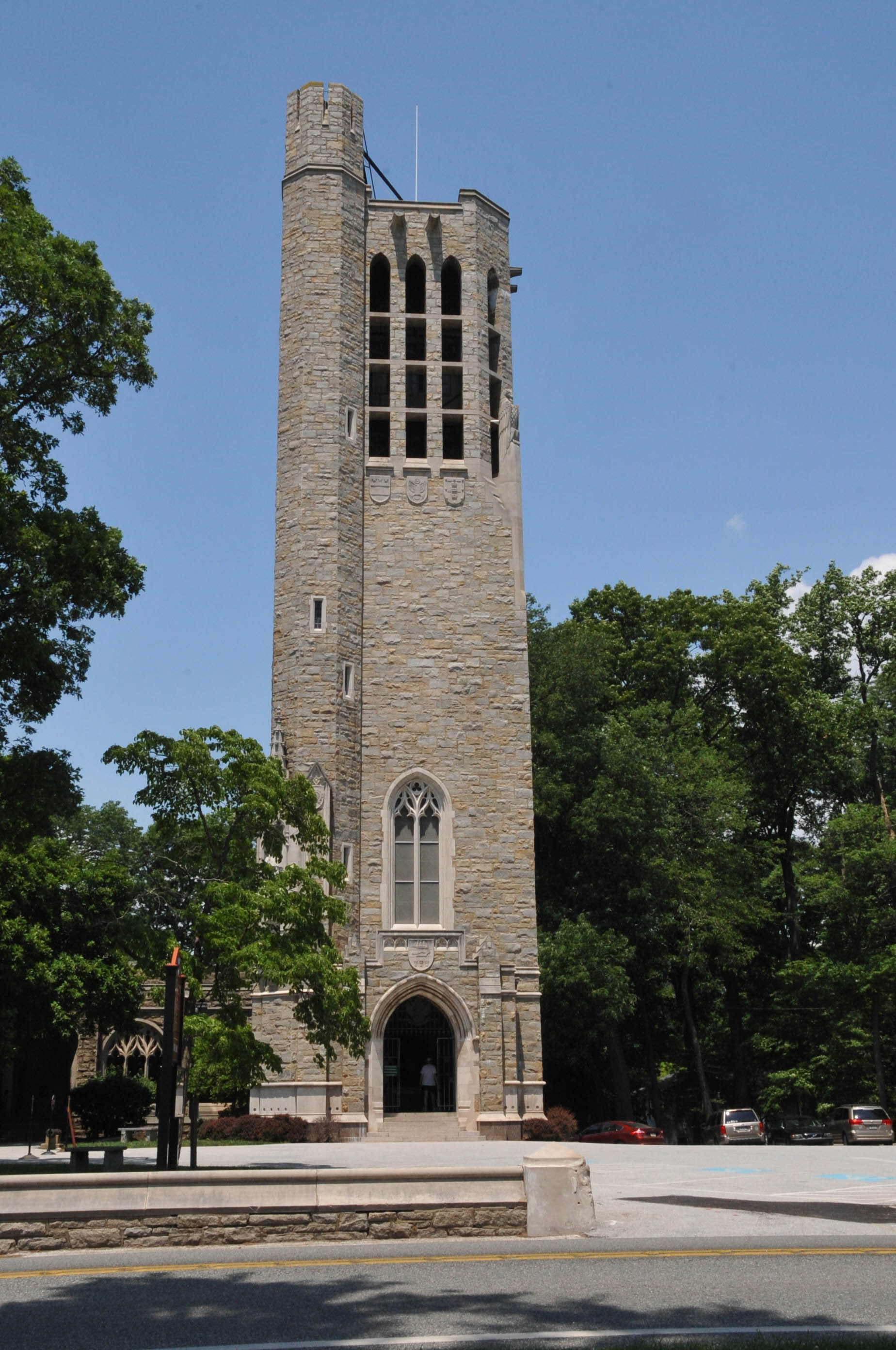
National Patriots Bell Tower (1953)

The National Patriots Bell Tower was a later addition to the chapel, and houses its carillon. The 102 ft (31 m) tower was built entirely with funds raised by members of the National Society of the Daughters of the American Revolution (DAR) over a period of more than a decade. Construction began in 1941, but was suspended due to World War II, and restarted in 1949. The bell tower was completed and dedicated in 1953.

The Justice Bell (Women's Liberty Bell) is on permanent display in the bell tower chamber. It was forged in 1915 as a nearly identical replica of the Liberty Bell, and became an instrumental symbol of the Women's Suffrage movement. In 1920, after touring many parts of the country to promote the passing of the 19th Amendment, the bell was stored on the grounds of Valley Forge National Park before being permanently moved to the bell tower chamber in 1943.

The bell tower contains a traditional carillon, with a keyboard of 58 bells. The first 14 bells (from the Meneely Bell Foundry) were installed in a temporary wooden tower in 1926, and the number of bells expanded over the course of three decades. Fifty-six bells were installed in the bell tower in 1953, and expanded to 58 bells in 1963 with two bells from the Fonderie Paccard in France.

The bell tower is played regularly by a resident carillonneur. Concerts, both formal and informal, are held throughout the year and are open to the public.

== Features ==
=== Stained glass ===
The chapel contains numerous stained glass windows designed by Nicola D'Ascenzo, including:

- George Washington Window, south wall over entrance, depicting 36 scenes from Washington's life
- Anthony Wayne Window, west wall, depicting 12 scenes of American expansion
- Alexander Hamilton Window, east wall
- Martha Washington Window (1918), north wall over altar
- Washington at Prayer Window, carillon tower chamber
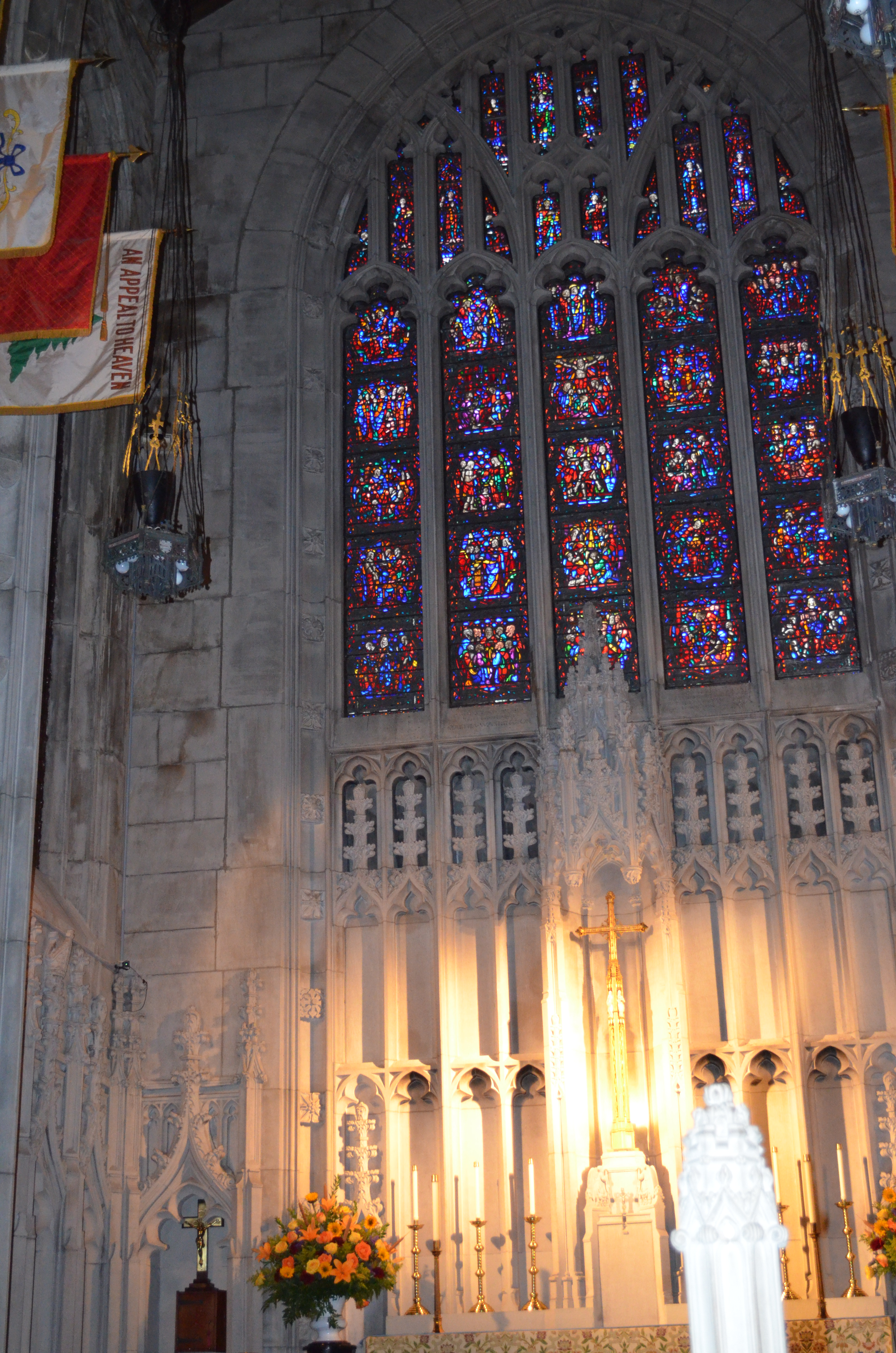
Martha Washington Window (1918).

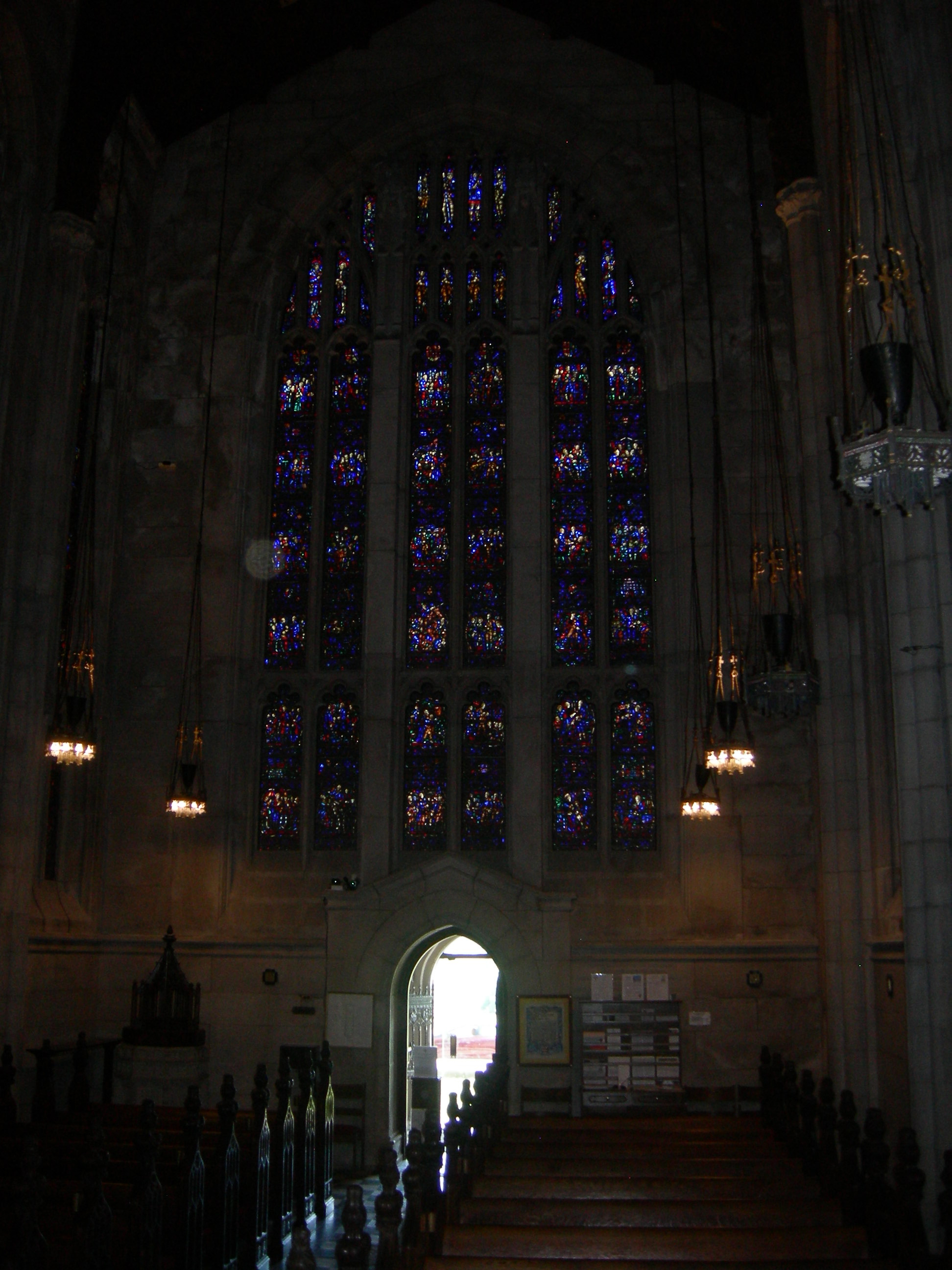
George Washington Window.

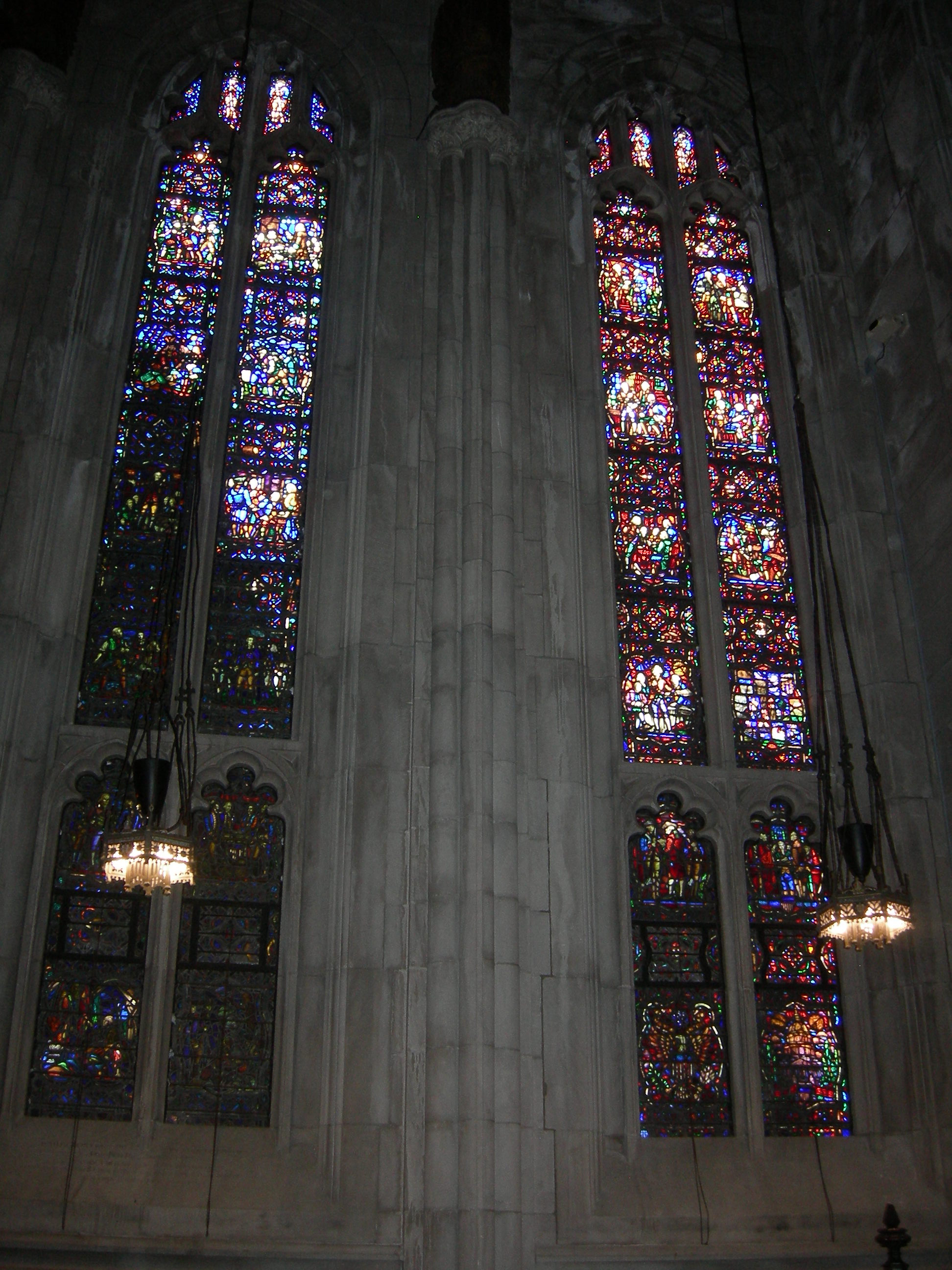
Patriotism Window and The Union Window.

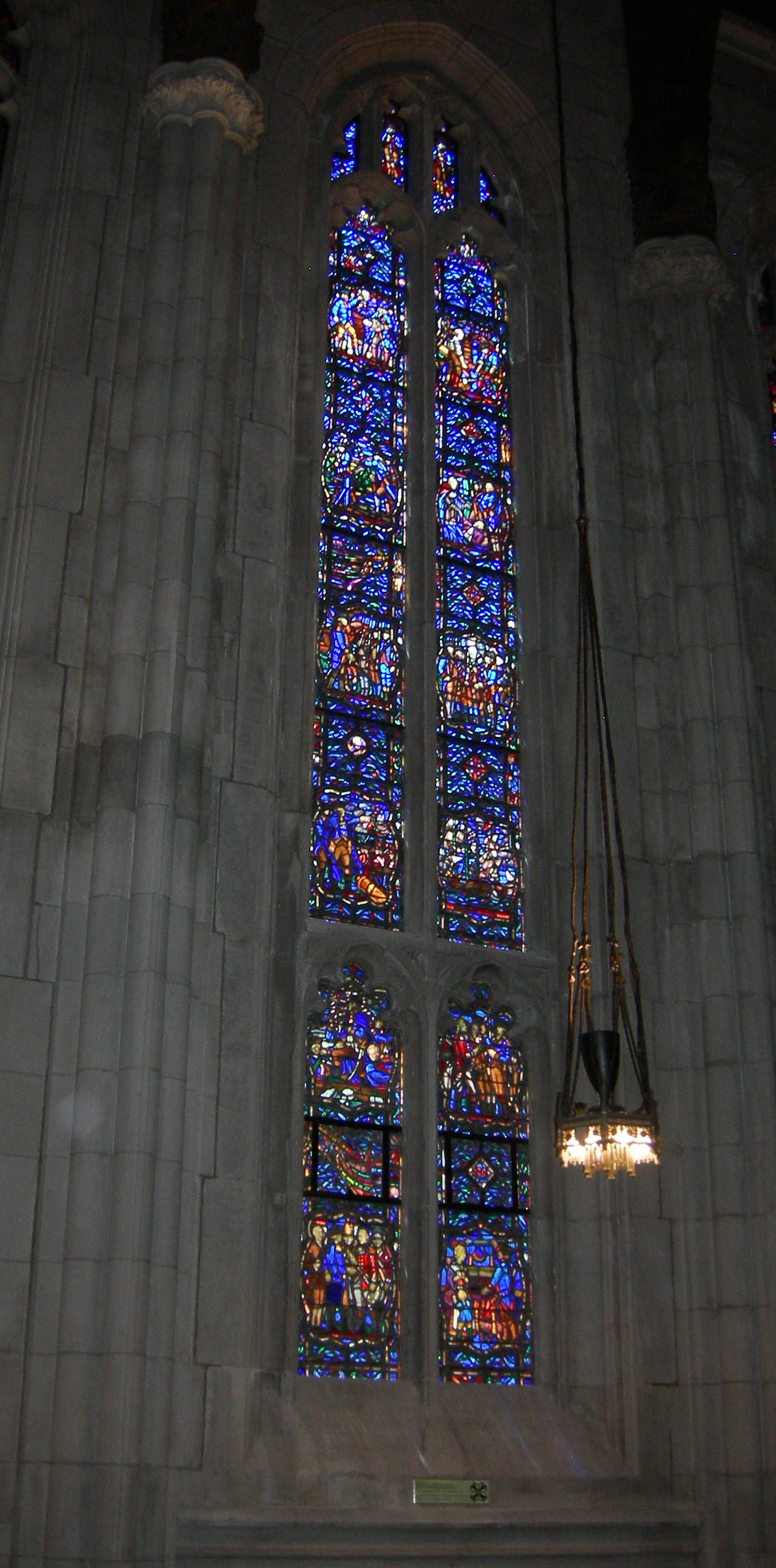
John Paul Jones Window.

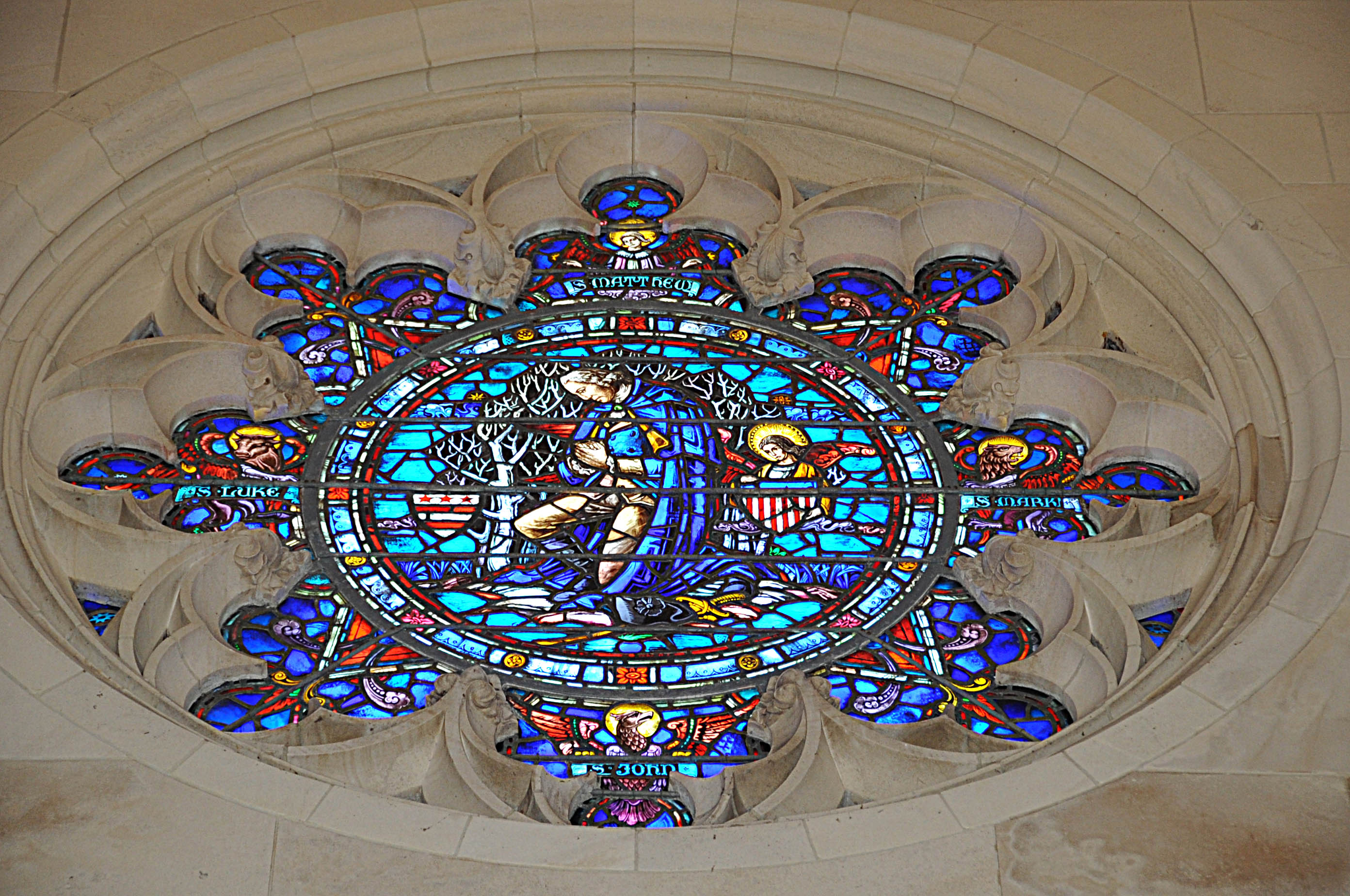
Washington at Prayer Window.

=== Church furniture ===
The chapel also features numerous pieces of furntiture designed by Milton B. Medary and carved by Edward Maene, including:

- Baptismal font (limestone & oak, 1907)
- Pulpit (limestone, 1909)
- Lectern and Perclose (limestone, 1909)
- Altar and reredos (limestone, 1916)
- Litany desk (Prie-dieu) (white oak, 1916), chancel
  - Dedicated in Memory of Anna Morris Holstein, Founder, Regent Centennial and Memorial Association, led efforts to save, acquire, and preserve Washington’s Headquarters and initial Valley Forge Park acreage; presented by Daughters of the American Revolution (D.A.R.) and Patriotic Order Sons of America (POS of A).
- Pews of the Patriots (white oak, 1917). The nave's left front pew is the Presidents' Pew, dedicated to George Washington and James Monroe, the two future Presidents of the United States who endured the Valley Forge winter encampment.
- Choir stalls and reredos (white oak, 1917–21), choir
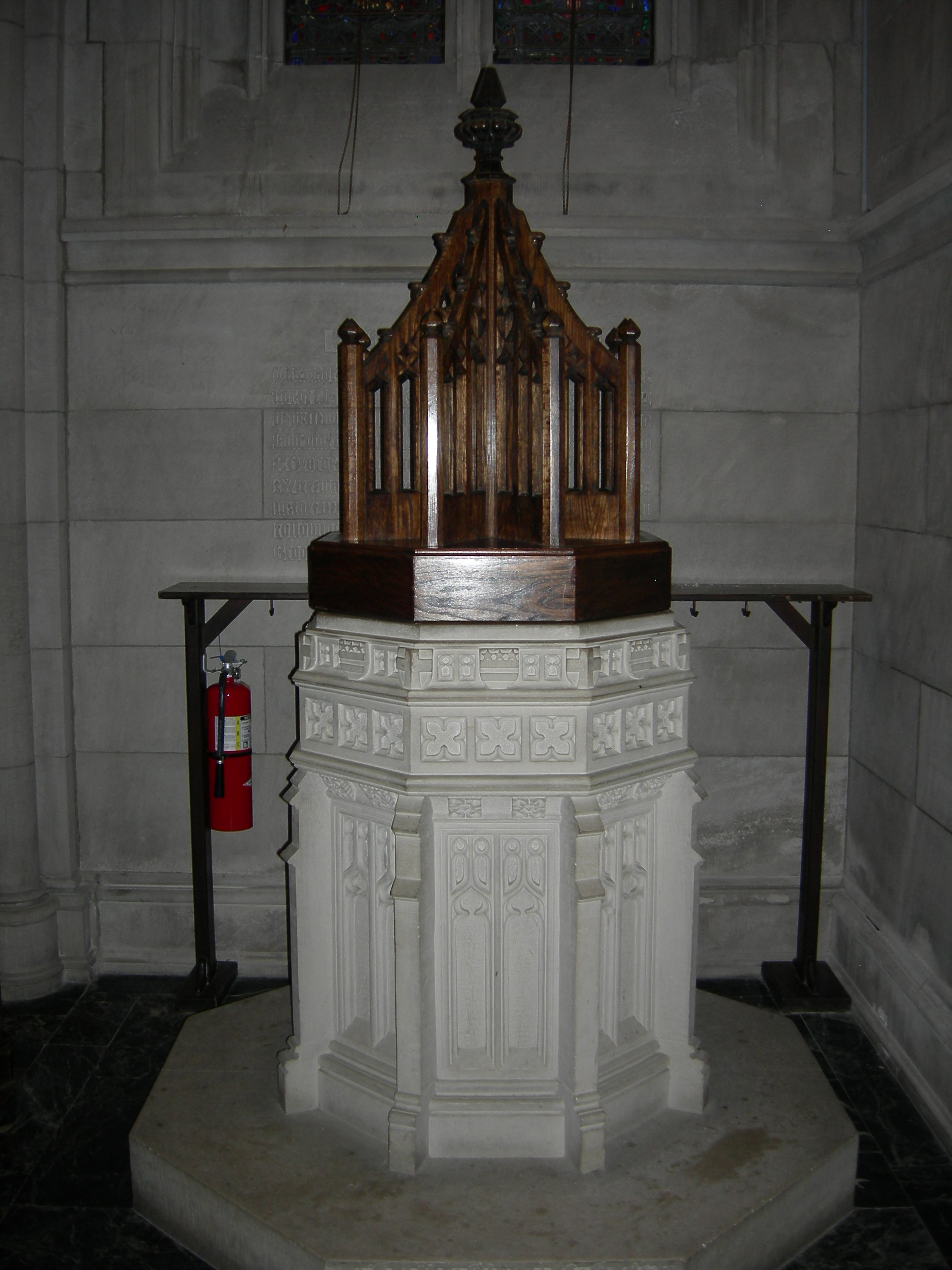
Baptismal font (1907).

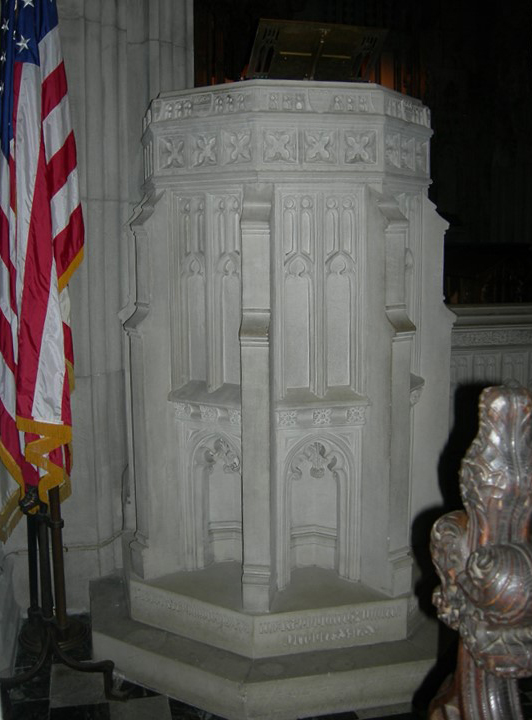
Pulpit (1909).

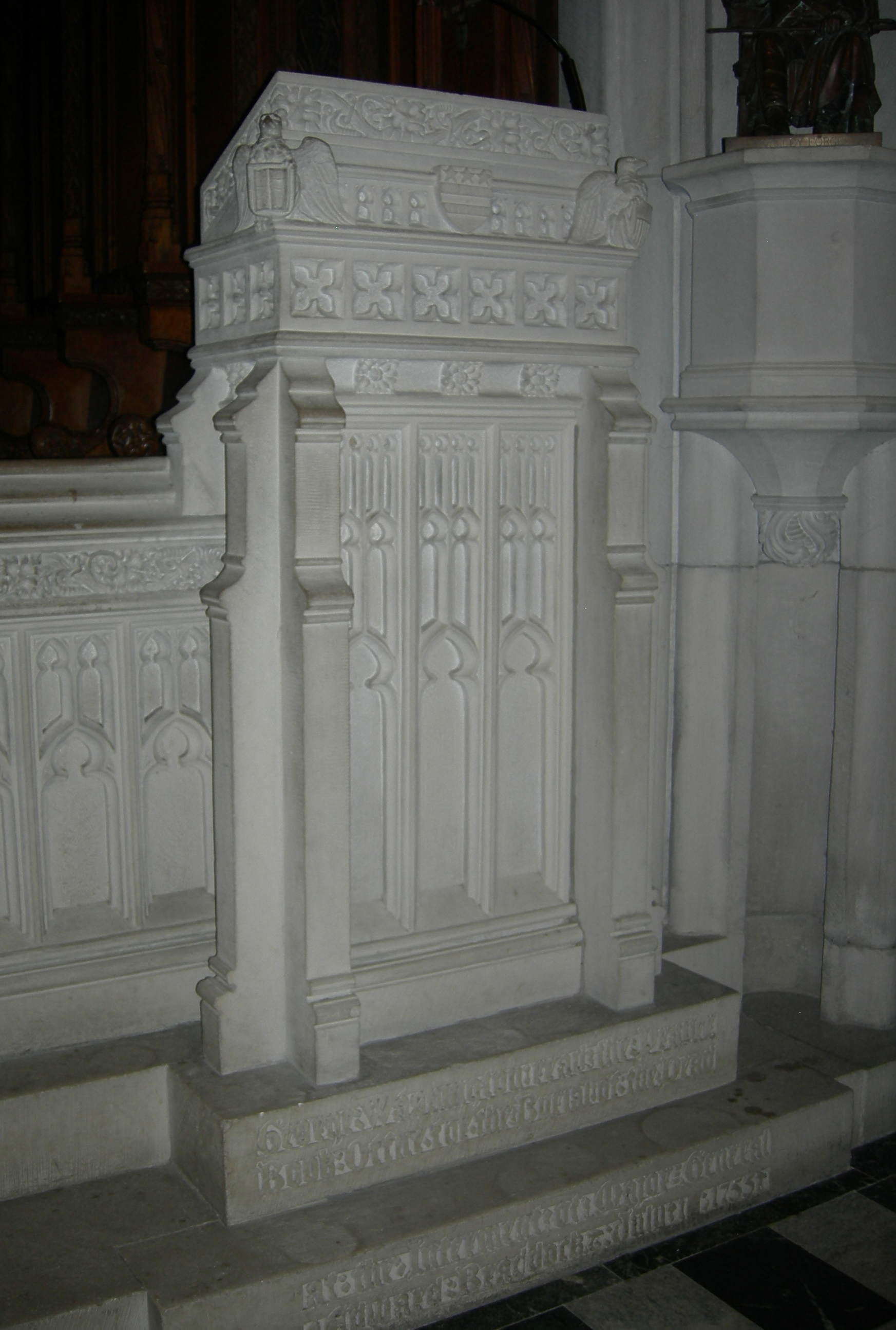
Lectern and Perclose (1909).

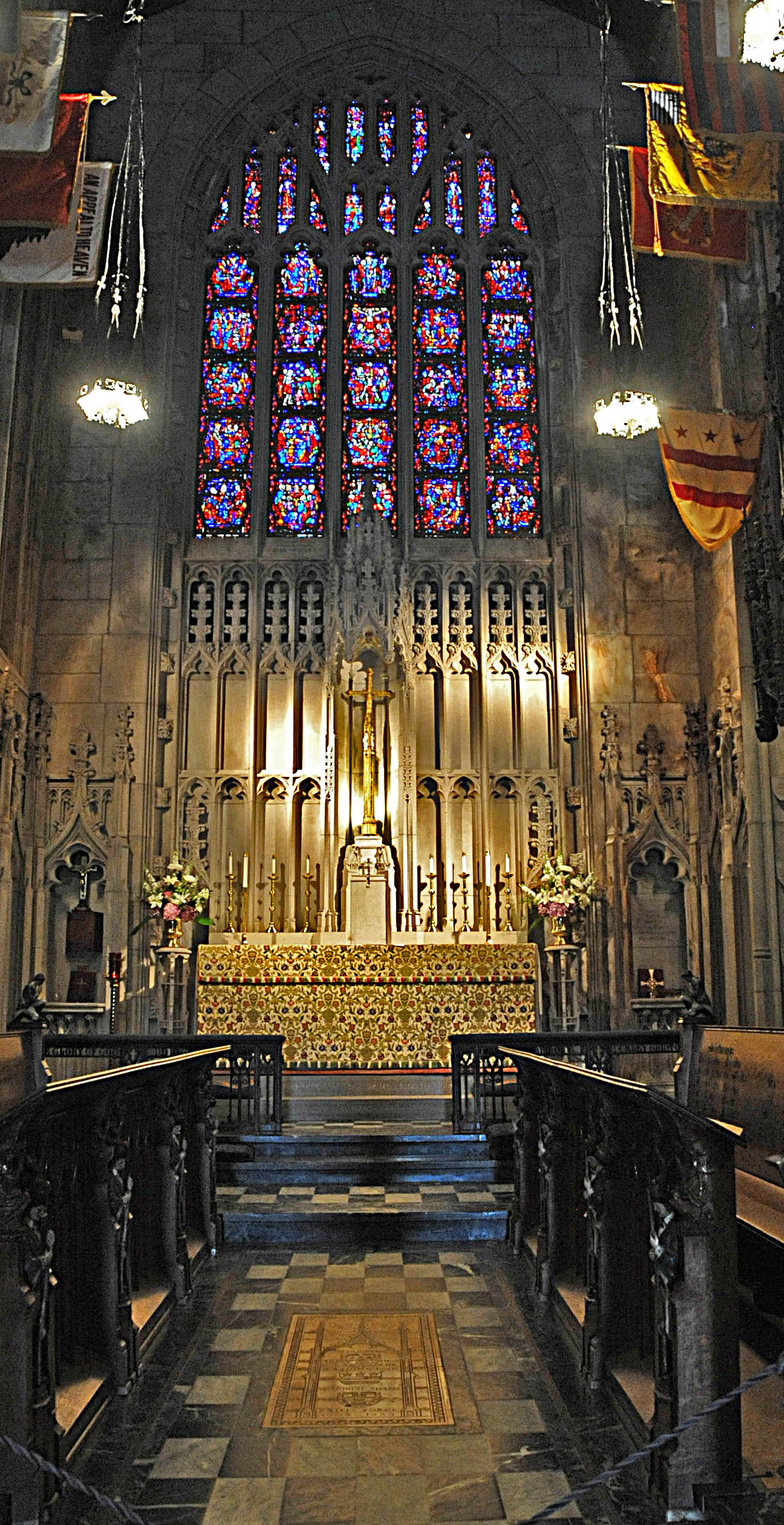
Altar and reredos (1916).

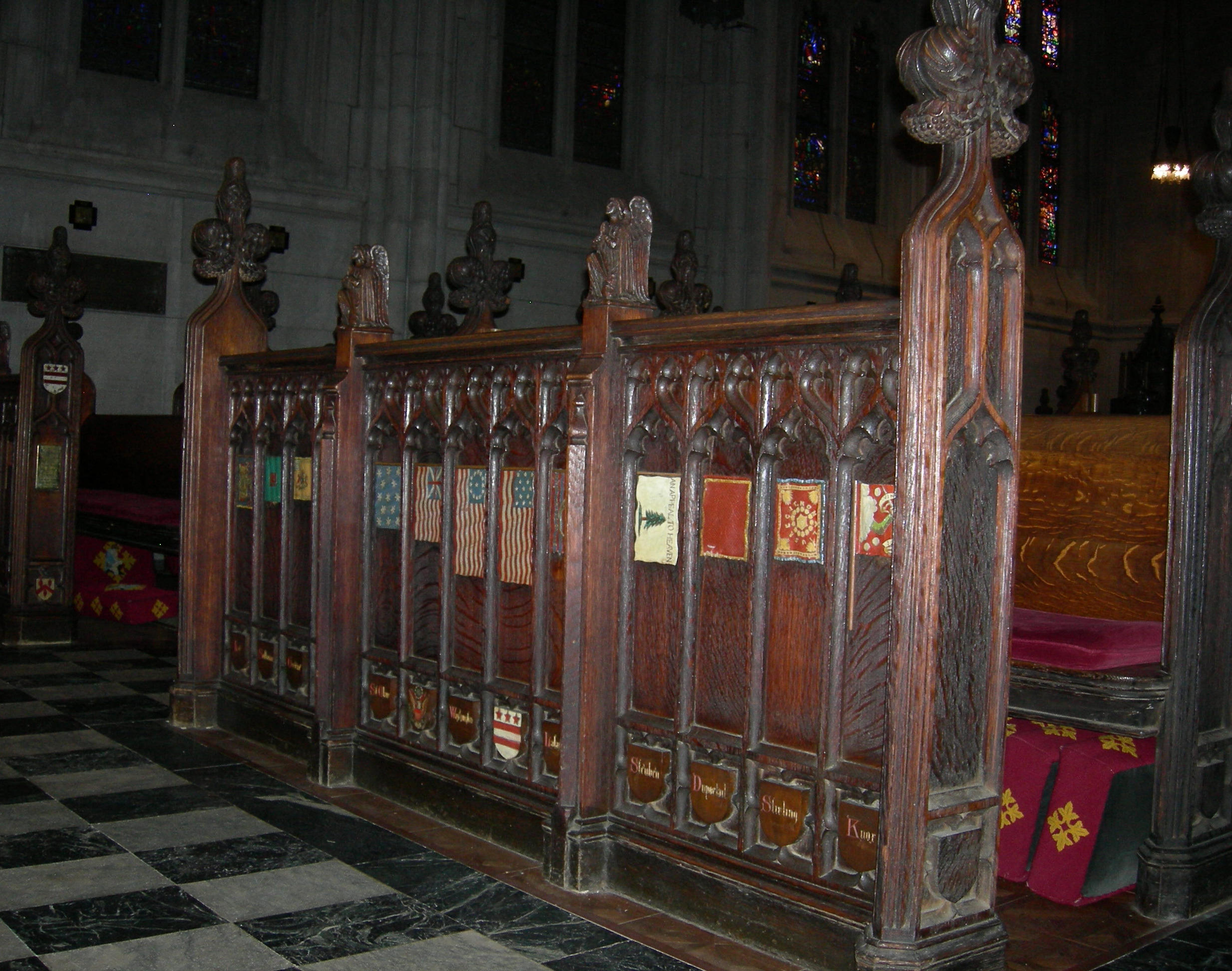
Screen for Presidents' Pew (1917).

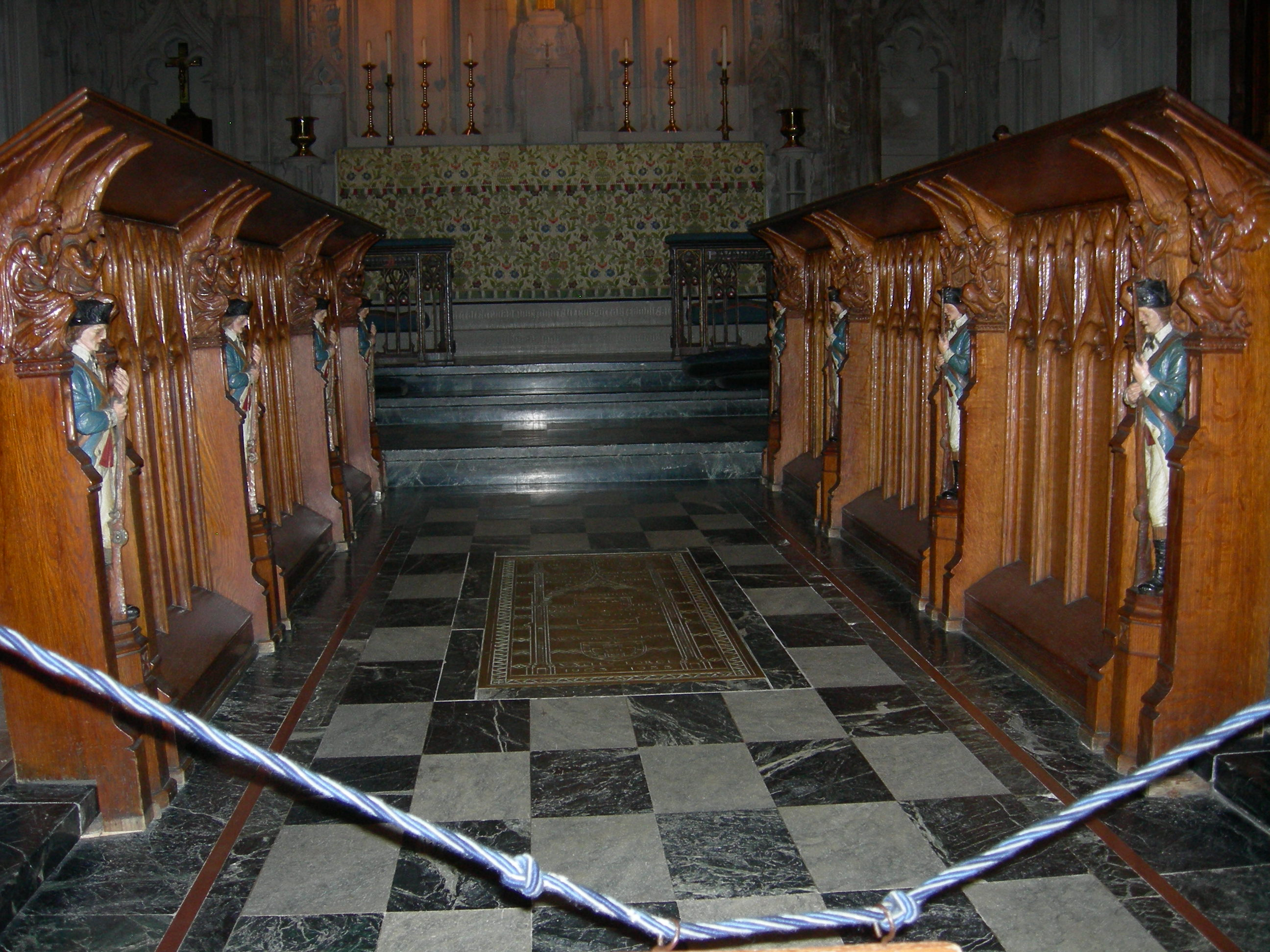
Choir screens (1917).

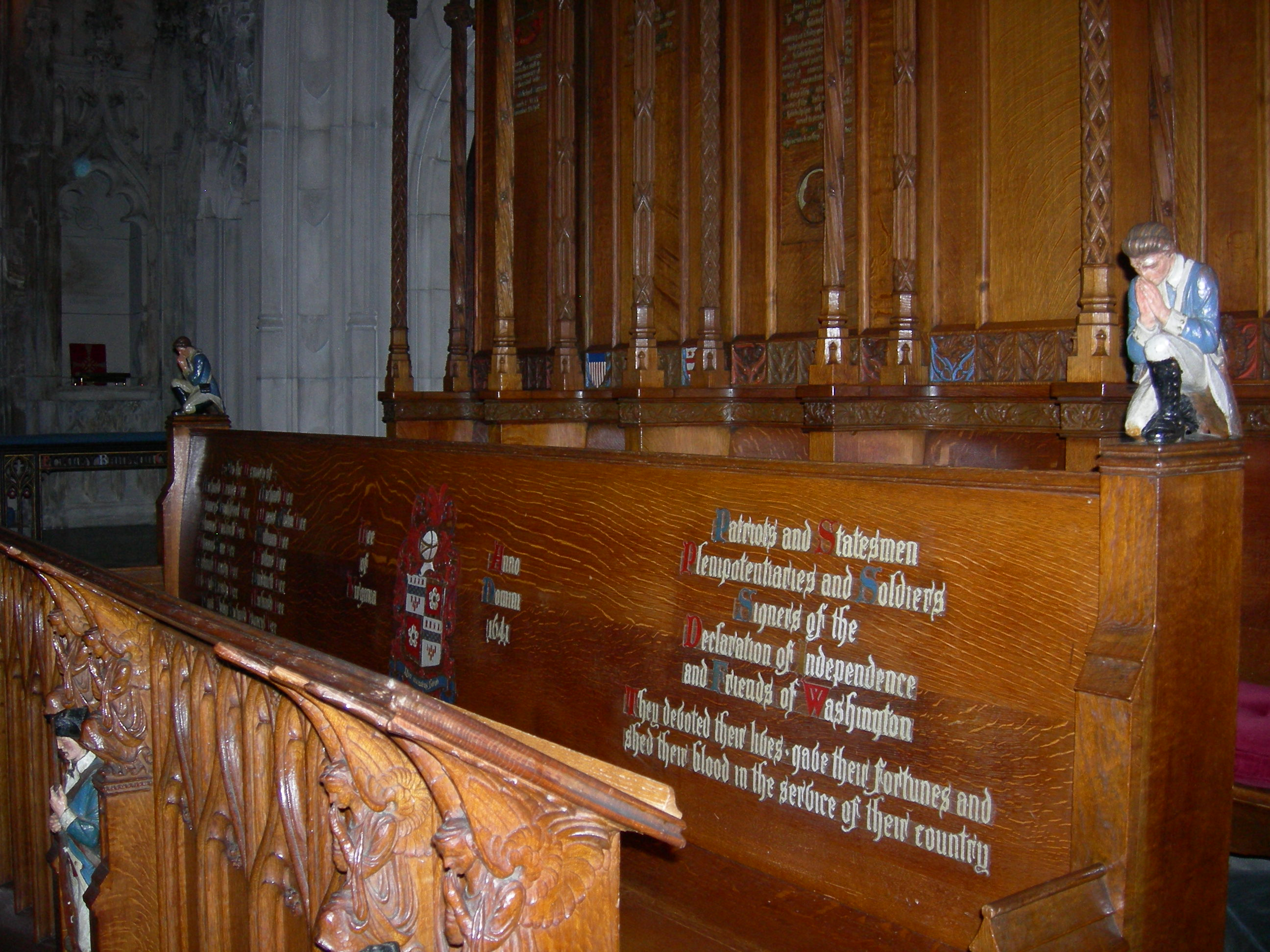
East choir stalls (1917).

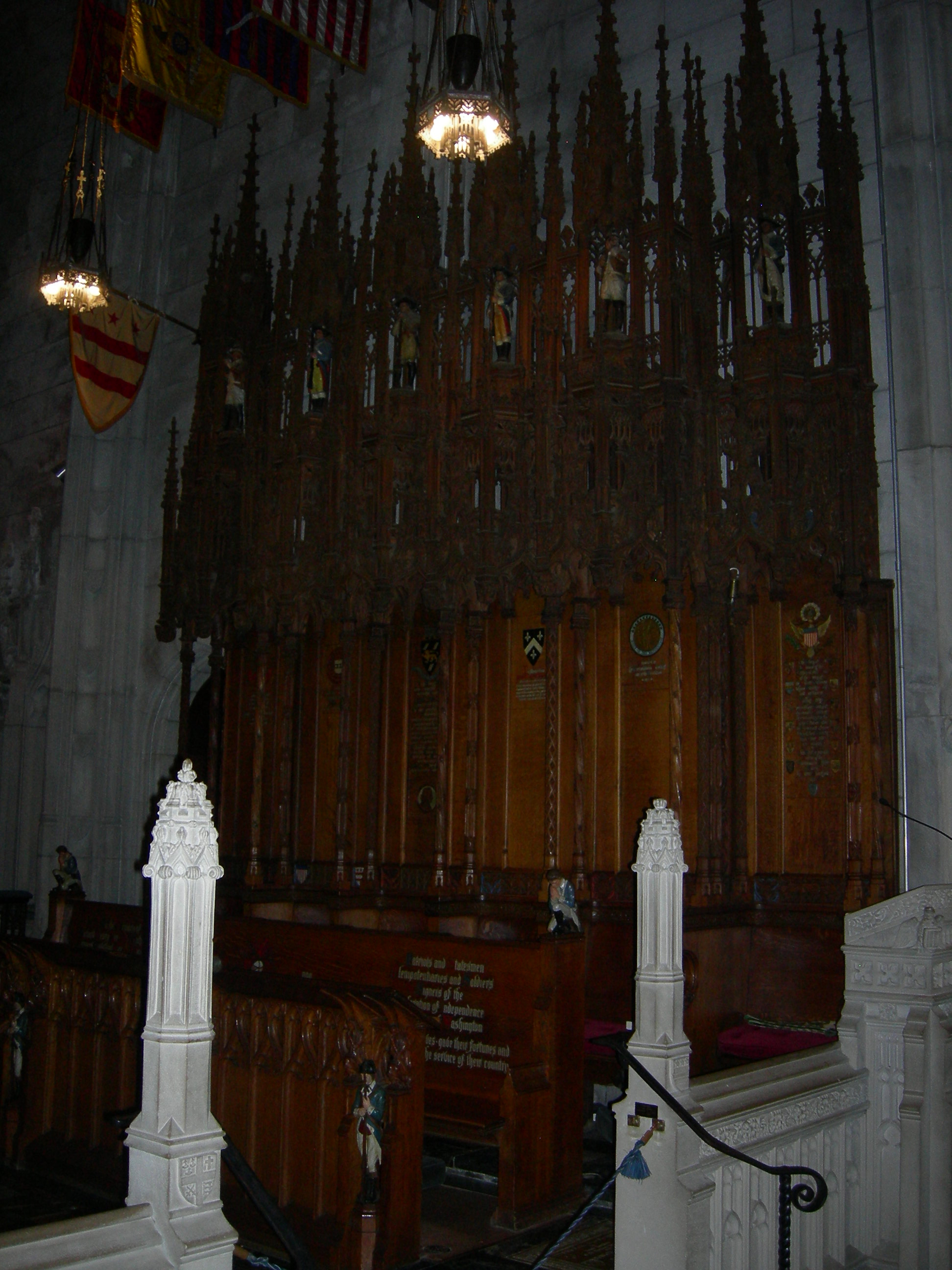
East choir reredos (c.1920).

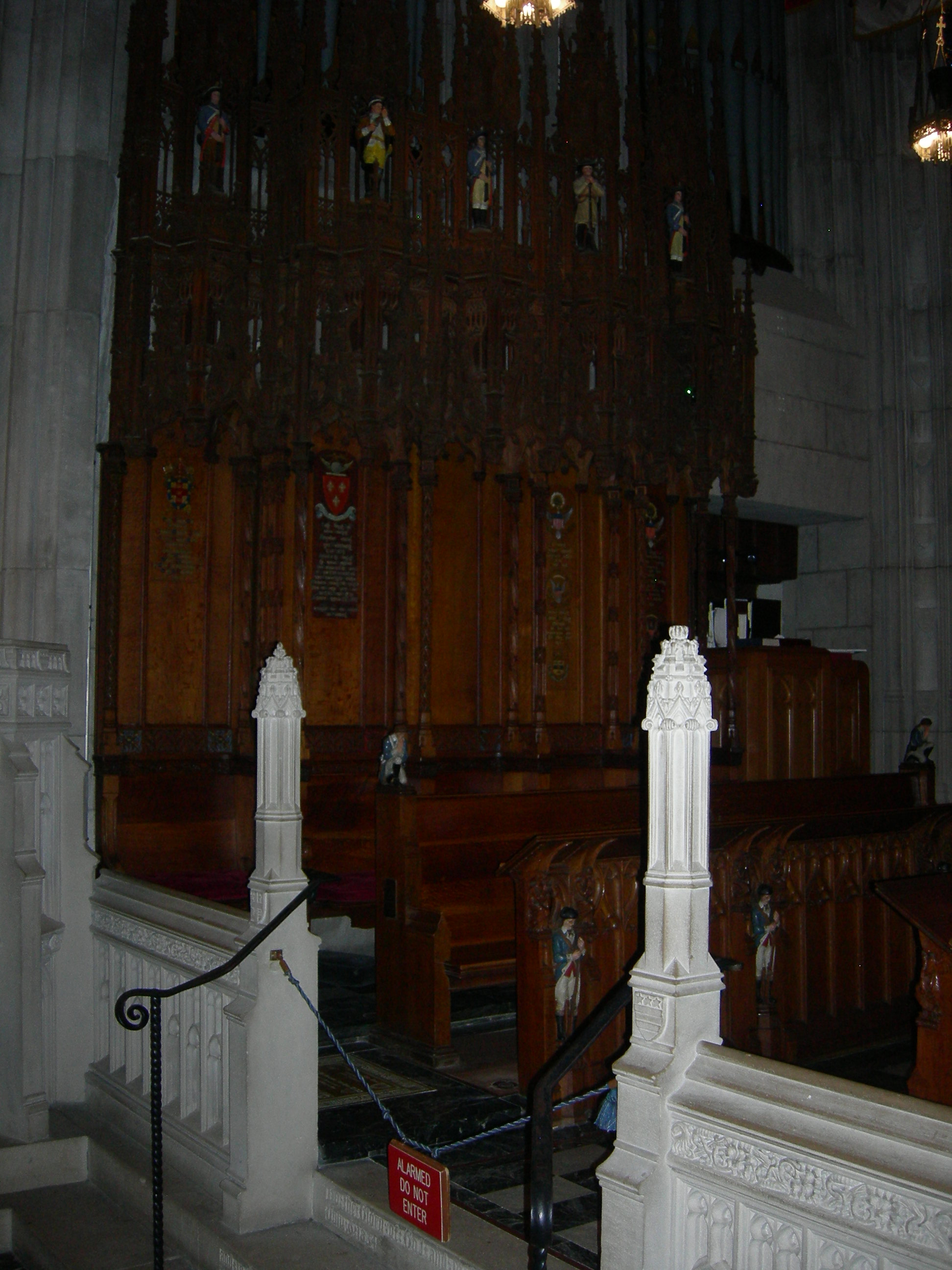
West choir reredos (c.1920).

=== Sculpture ===
- Valley Forge (Seated Washington) (statuette, bronze, 1878), rood screen, Franklin Simmons, sculptor
- Sacrifice and Devotion (Grieving Mother) (statue, bronze, 1914), Heckscher Memorial, Cloister of the Colonies Garden, Bela Pratt, sculptor
- Harrison Memorial Gates (wrought iron, 1918), porch, Samuel Yellin, metalworker
- Declaration of Independence Tablet (bas relief, limestone, 1926), nave, Martha Maulsby Hovenden, sculptor
- United States Constitution Tablet (bas relief, limestone, 1936), nave, Martha Maulsby Hovenden, sculptor
- Bishop William White (statue, bronze, 1937), Alexander Stirling Calder, sculptor
- George Washington (statue, limestone, 1953), exterior of National Patriots Bell Tower, C. Paul Jennewein, sculptor
- Nathanael Greene (statue, bronze, 2015), front lawn, Susie Chisholm, sculptor.
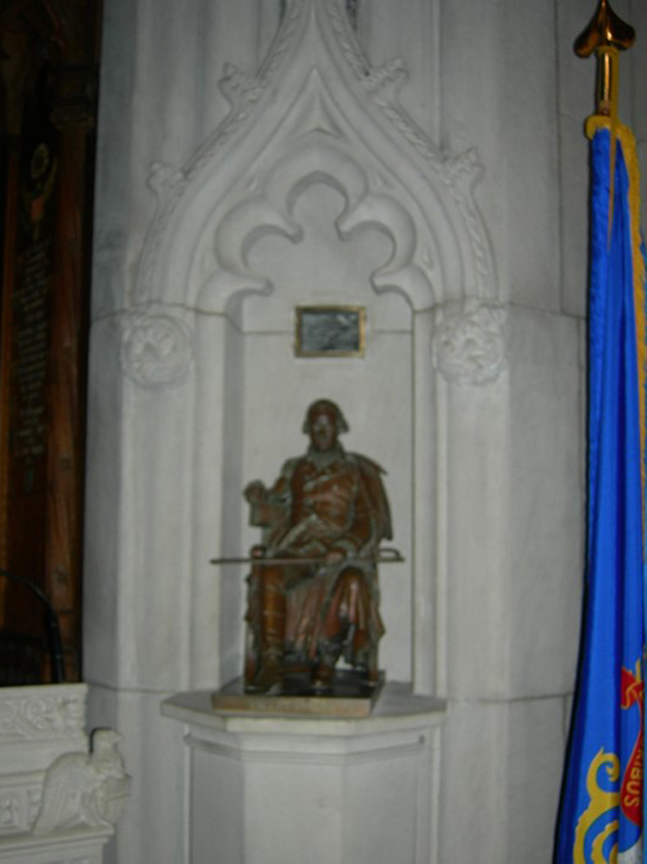
Valley Forge (1878), by Franklin Simmons.

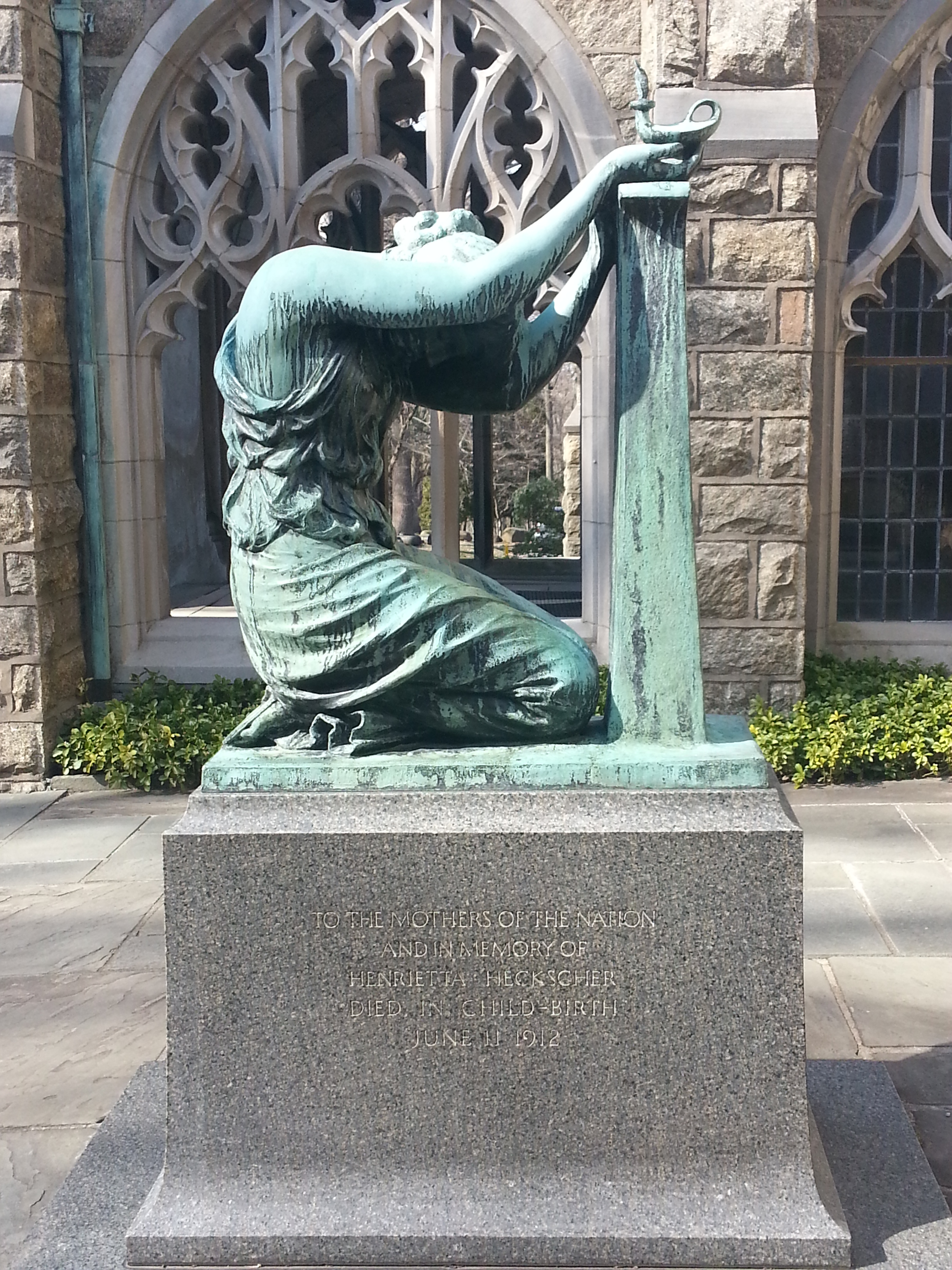
Grieving Mother (1914), by Bela Pratt, Cloister of the Colonies Garden.

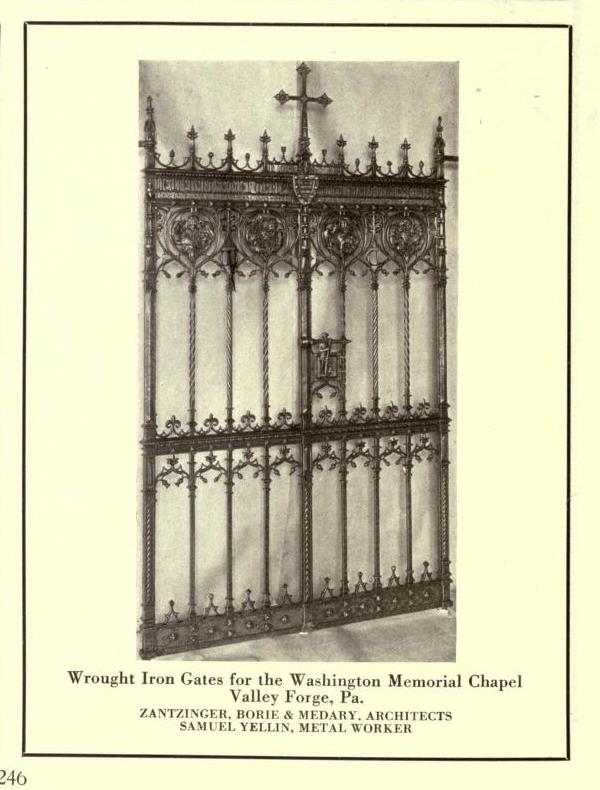
Harrison Memorial Gates (1918), by Samuel Yellin,

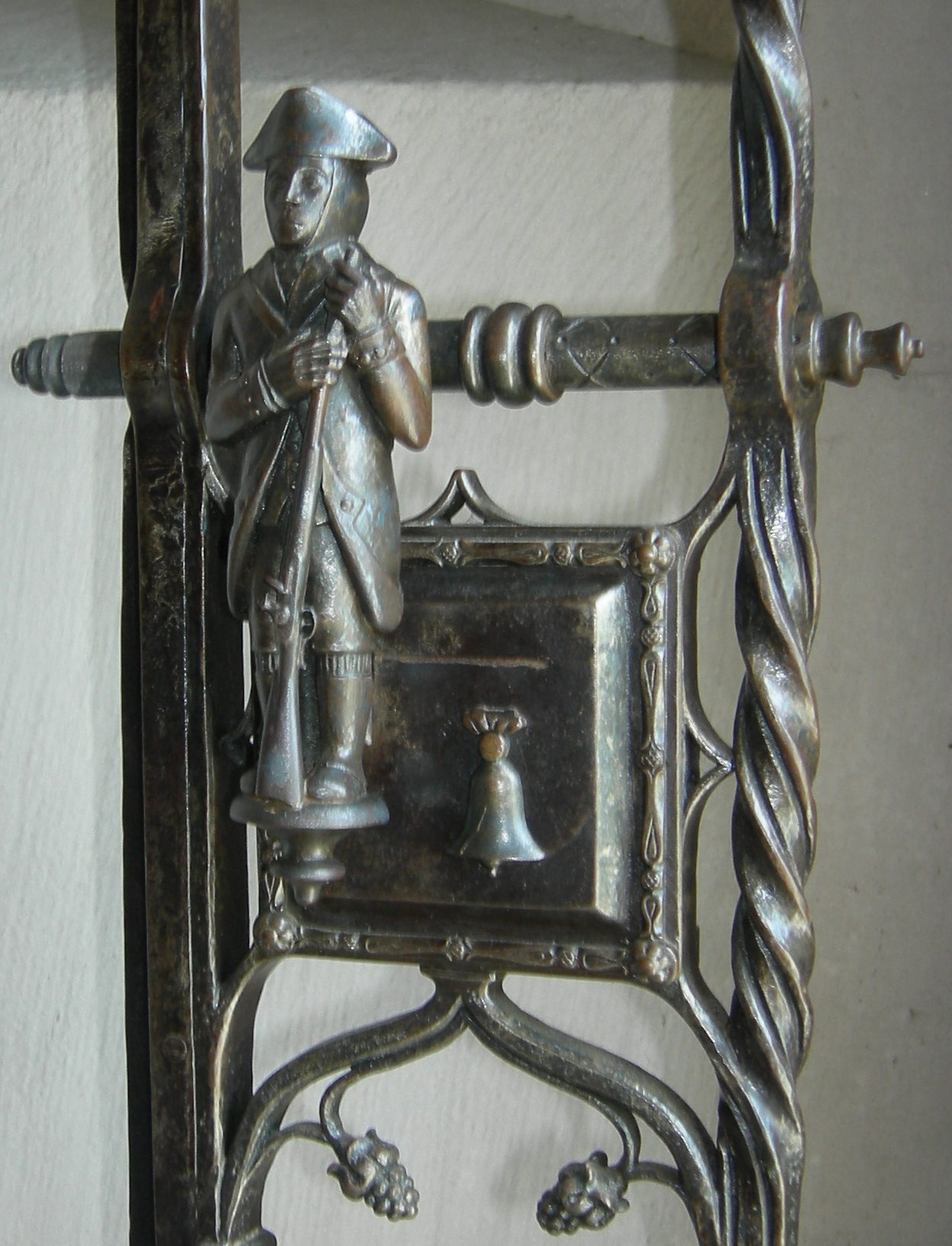
Minuteman Latch, Harrison Memorial Gates.

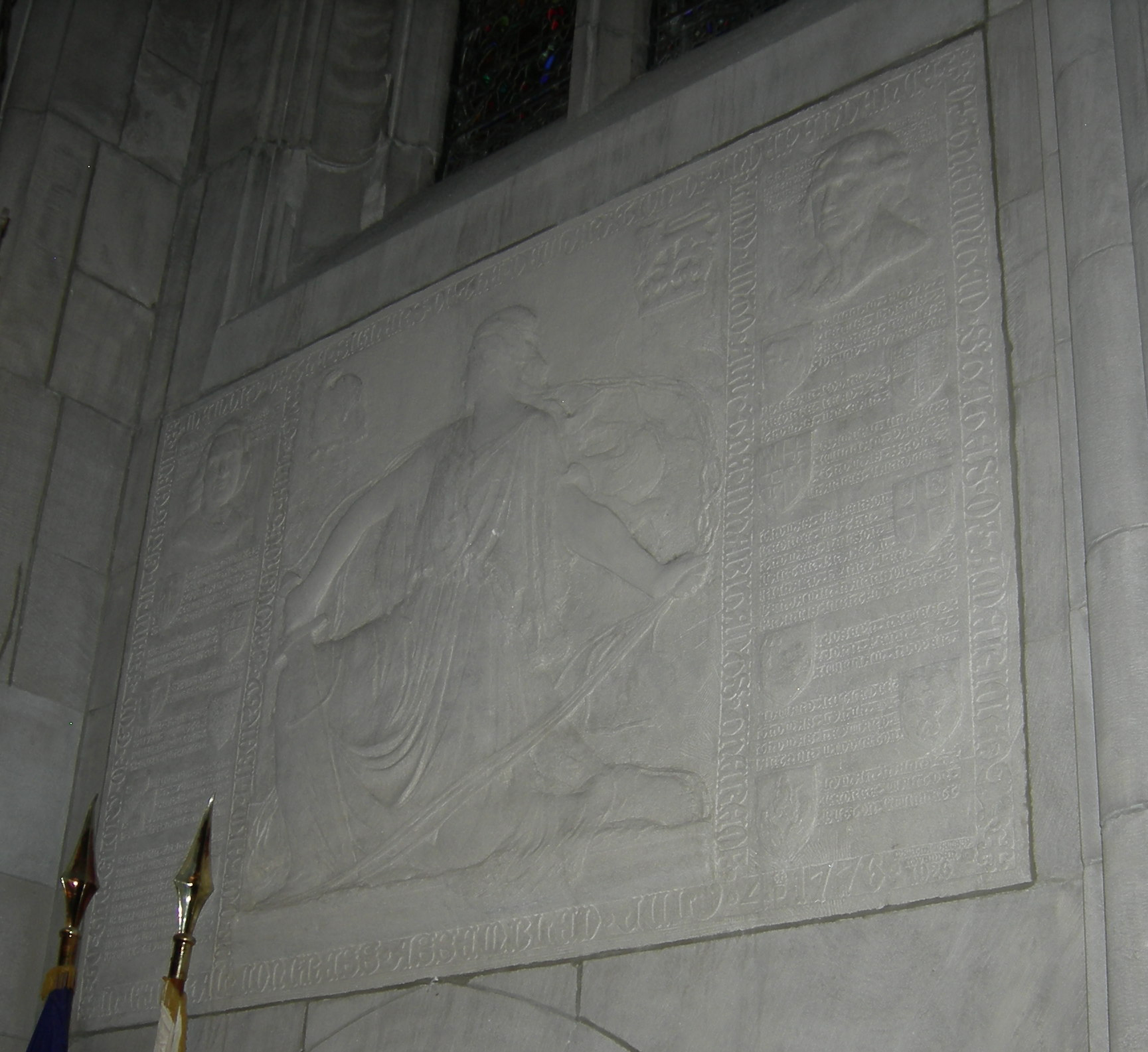
Declaration of Independence Tablet (1926), by Martha M. Hovenden.

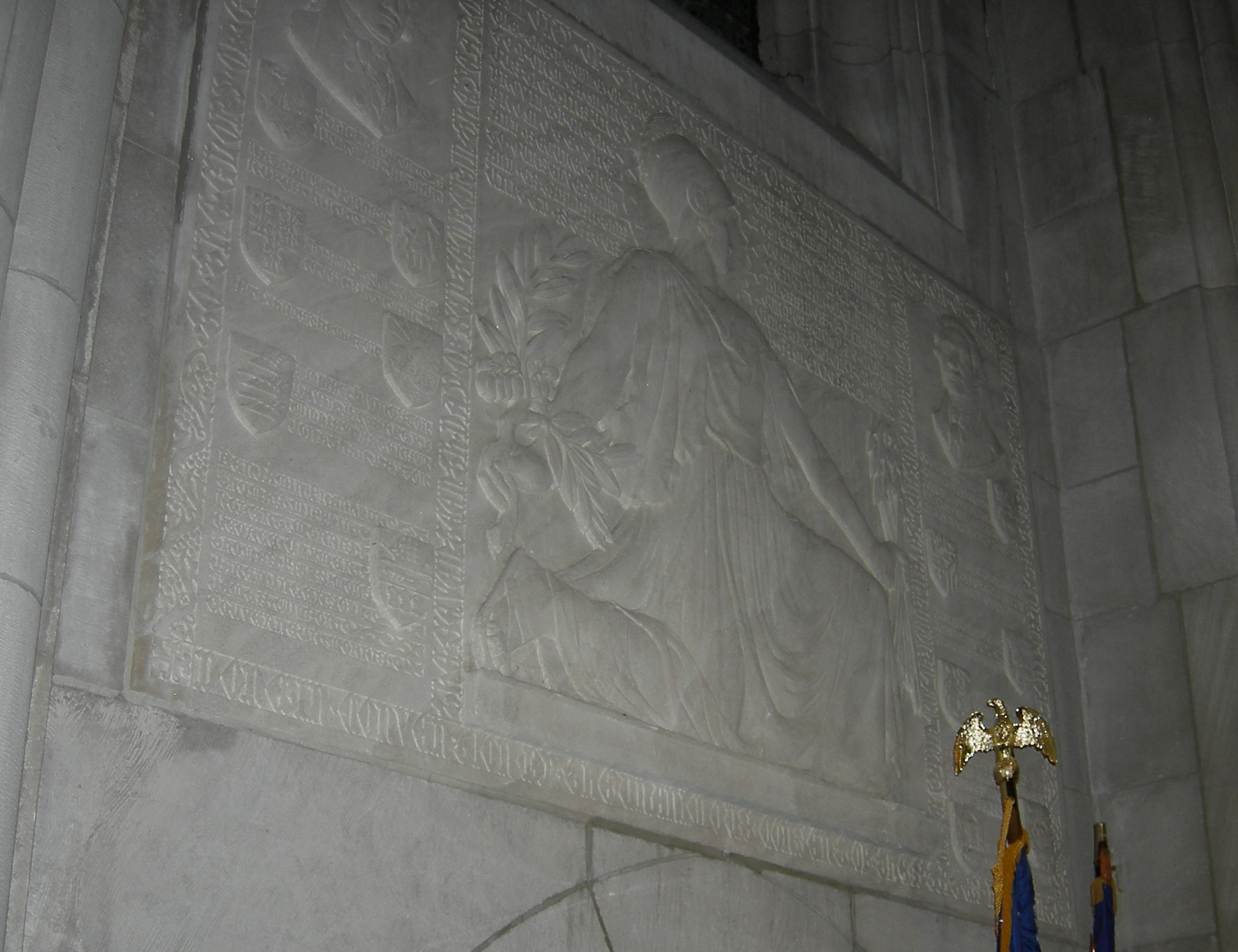
United States Constitution Tablet (1936), by Martha M. Hovenden.

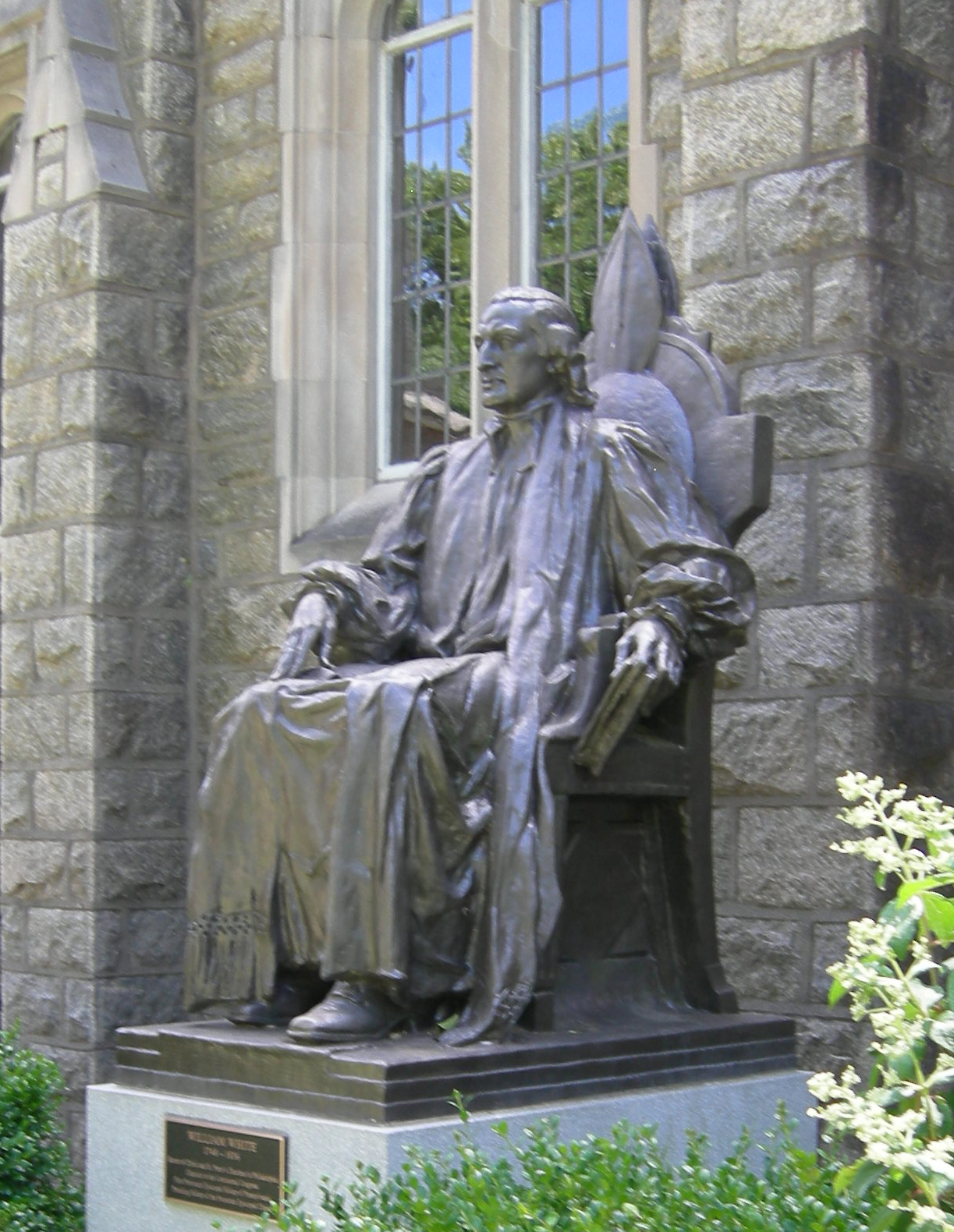
Bishop William White (1937), by Alexander Stirling Calder, Bishop White Garden.

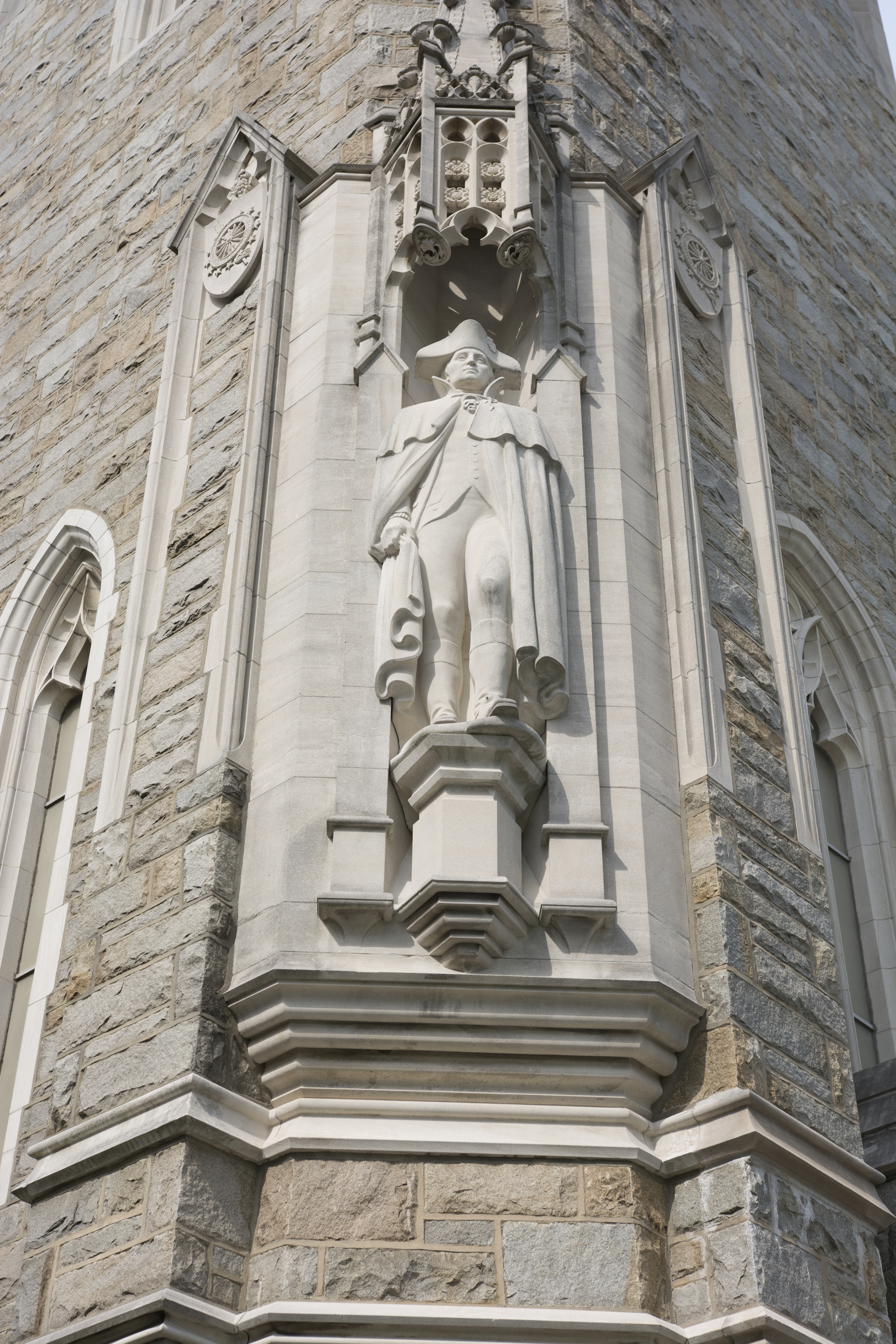
George Washington (1953), by C. Paul Jennewein, exterior of bell tower.

=== Other media ===
- Mosaic portrait bust of George Washington, bell tower chamber, Nicola D'Ascenzo, designer
- Justice Bell (aka The Women's Liberty Bell) (1915), National Patriots Bell Tower chamber.
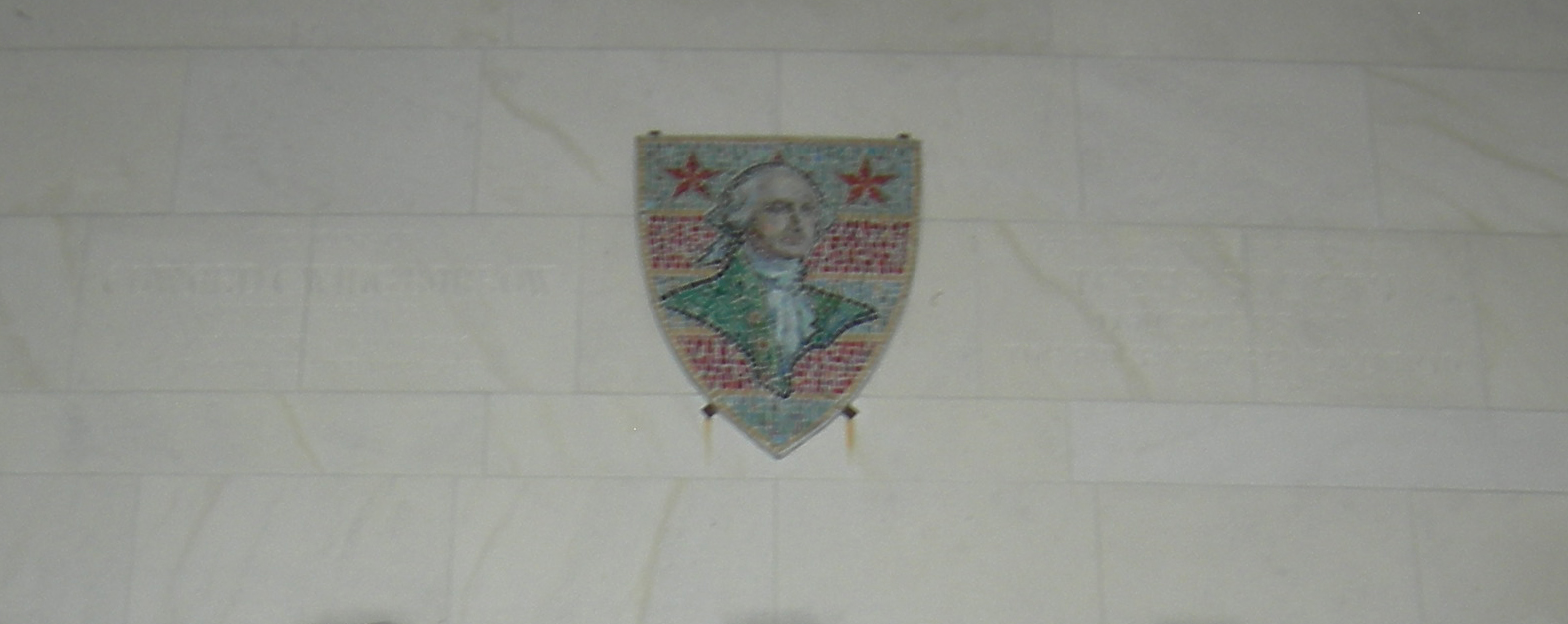
Washington mosaic portrait bust (year), by Nicola D'Ascenzo

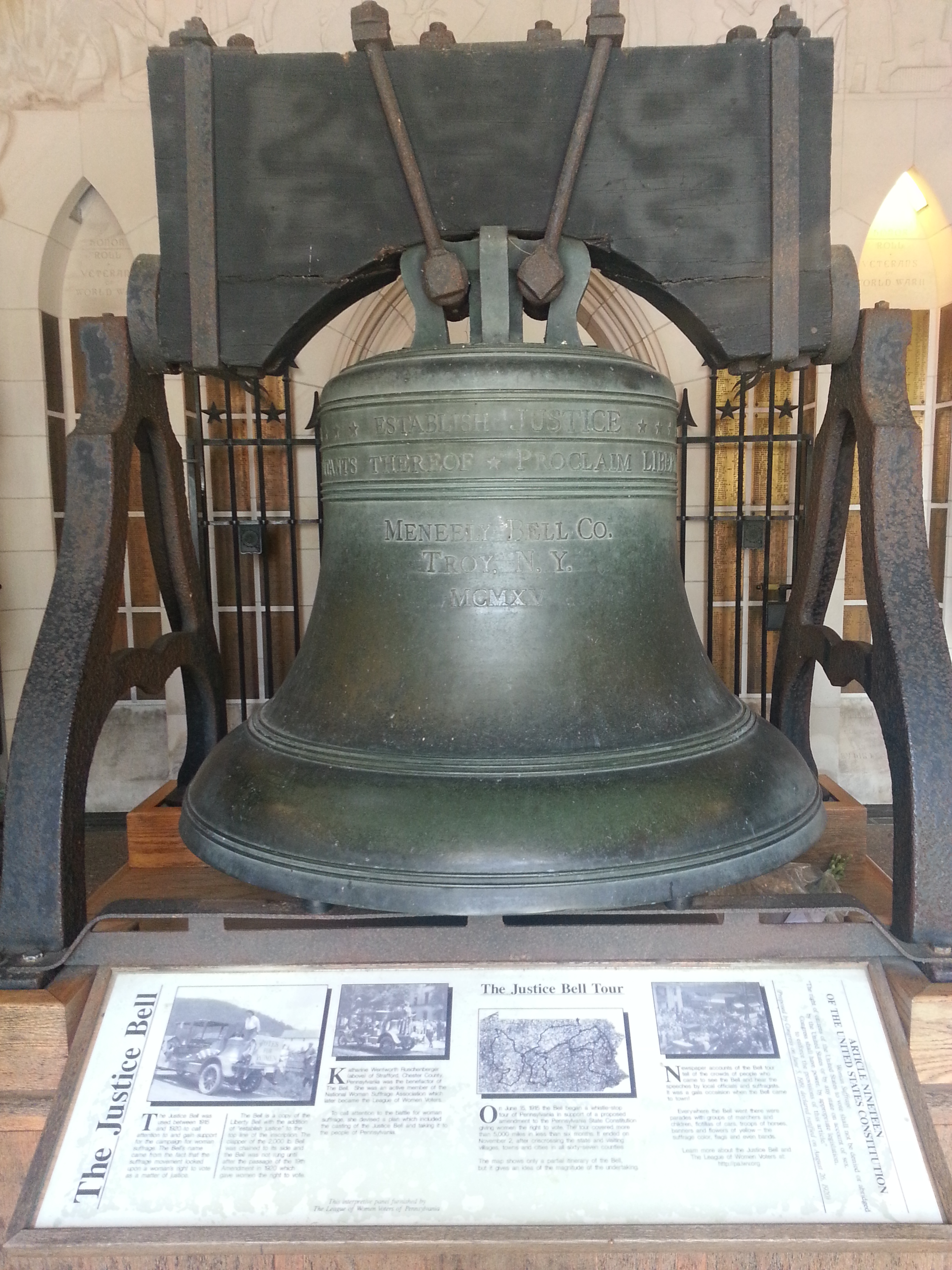
Justice Bell (1915), National Patriots Bell Tower chamber.

== See also ==
- Valley Forge Pilgrimage
- List of carillons in the United States

== Resources ==
- Rev. W. Herbert Burk, D.D., Making a Museum: The Confessions of a Curator (1926). Burk was the founder and curator of the Valley Forge Museum of American History.
- D'Ascenzo Studios, The Memorial Windows, Washington Memorial Chapel, Valley Forge, Pa. (1930).
- Eleanor H.S. Burk, In the Beginning: at Valley Forge and the Washington Memorial Chapel (1938).
- Perdue, Shelley A. (2005). "The Washington Memorial Chapel: Historic Structure Report and Condition Assessment". University of Pennsylvania ScholarlyCommons. Archived from the original on July 29, 2010.
