= Patriotic Order Sons of America =

Patriotic American fraternal society

The Patriotic Order Sons of America is an American patriotic fraternal organization that traces its origins to the anti-alien riots of the 1840s. Founded in 1847 in Philadelphia, the P.O.S. of A. once had "camps" (chapters) in well over 20 states. At its peak, there were more than 800 Camps in Pennsylvania alone. Today, the society maintains a presence only in Pennsylvania, where it has 14 camps. The national headquarters are in Valley Forge, Pennsylvania.

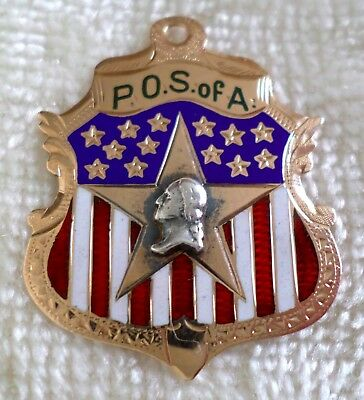
P. O. S. of A. watch fob from the early 20th century.

== History ==
It was founded as the Junior Sons of America, which was established in Philadelphia on December 10, 1847, by Dr. Reynell Coates. This organization was for young men aged 16 to 21. and was a 'feeder' group for the Sons of America. The parent group died out not long after, but the Junior Sons continued. Only one Camp remained active during the Civil War, as most members had volunteered for the Union. Camps in southern states largely disappeared. Following the Civil War, it reorganized, changing its name to Patriotic Order Sons of America.

Distinguishing features of the Order are its opposition to unrestricted immigration and its support of free public education.

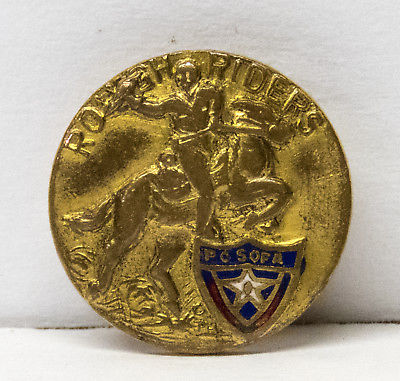
P.O.S. of A. "Rough Rider" pin

The entry for the group in Alan Axelrod's The International Encyclopedia of Secret Societies and Fraternal Orders contains a number of factual errors, but it reads as follows:

According to The International Encyclopedia of Secret Societies and Fraternal Orders, the group emerged as an anti-Catholic and anti-immigration society in Philadelphia prior to 1847. While the order declined following the collapse of the Know-Nothing Party, it was later revived in 1868.

The P.O.S. of A. also played a significant role in supporting and helping fund the Centennial and Memorial Association of Valley Forge after Regent Anna Morris Holstein approached them to help with saving, acquiring and preserving Washington's Headquarters and a portion of nearby surrounding acreage, which today is known as Valley Forge Park.

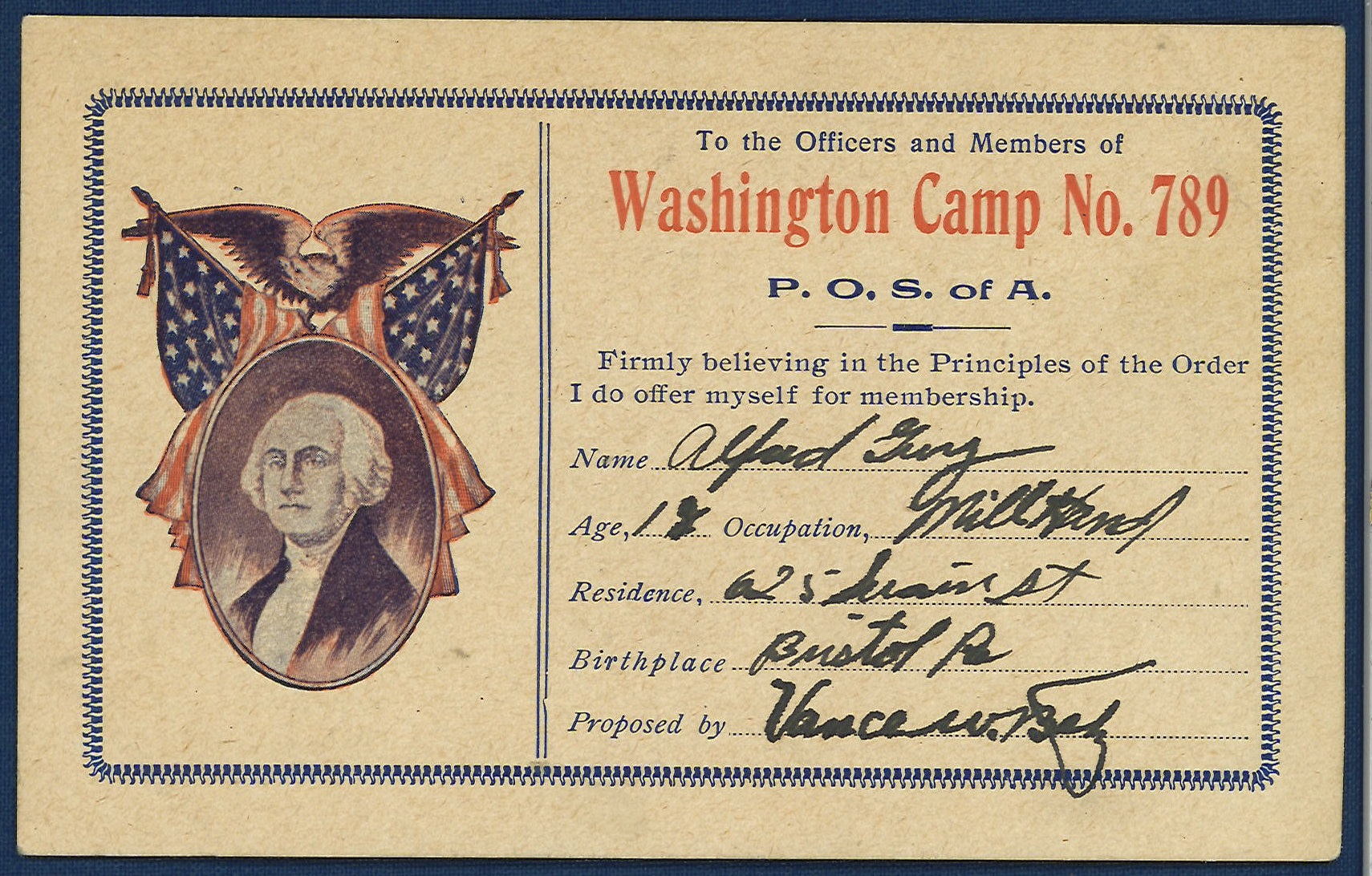
Front of a 1910s P. S. O. of A. membership application

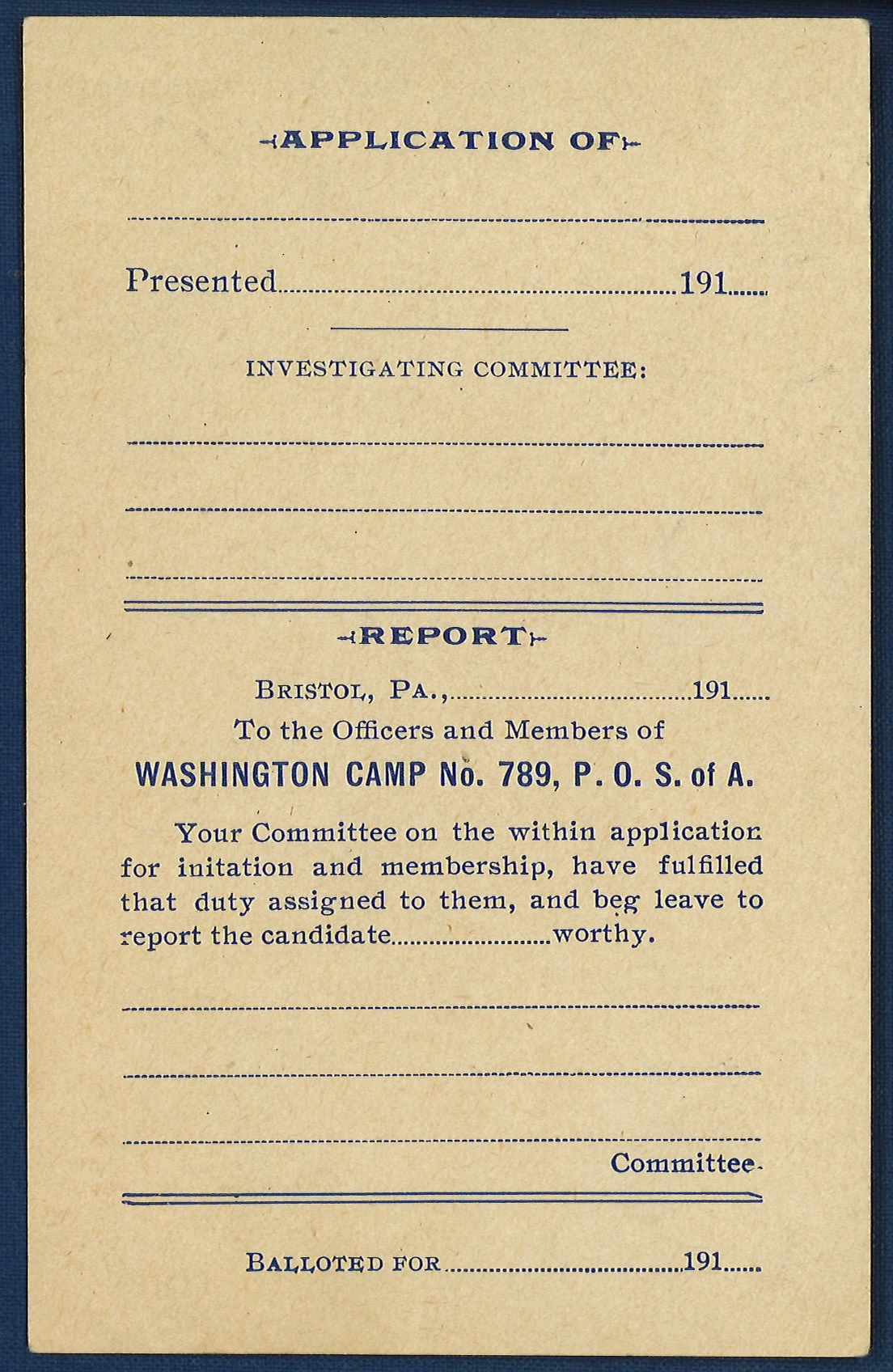
Back of 1910s P. S. O. of A. membership application

The P.O.S. of A. was organized under a National Camp, which had the power to issue charters to local camps, and also State Camps, which had a similar power. These are membership figures reported for 1900 to the 1901 meeting of the National Camp in Buffalo, New York.

State Camp	Members
Pennsylvania	62,317
New Jersey	5,151
Maryland	2,648
New York	1,709
Illinois	801
Ohio	421
Indiana	451
Connecticut	701
Colorado	311
Louisiana	149
Com. General	1,191

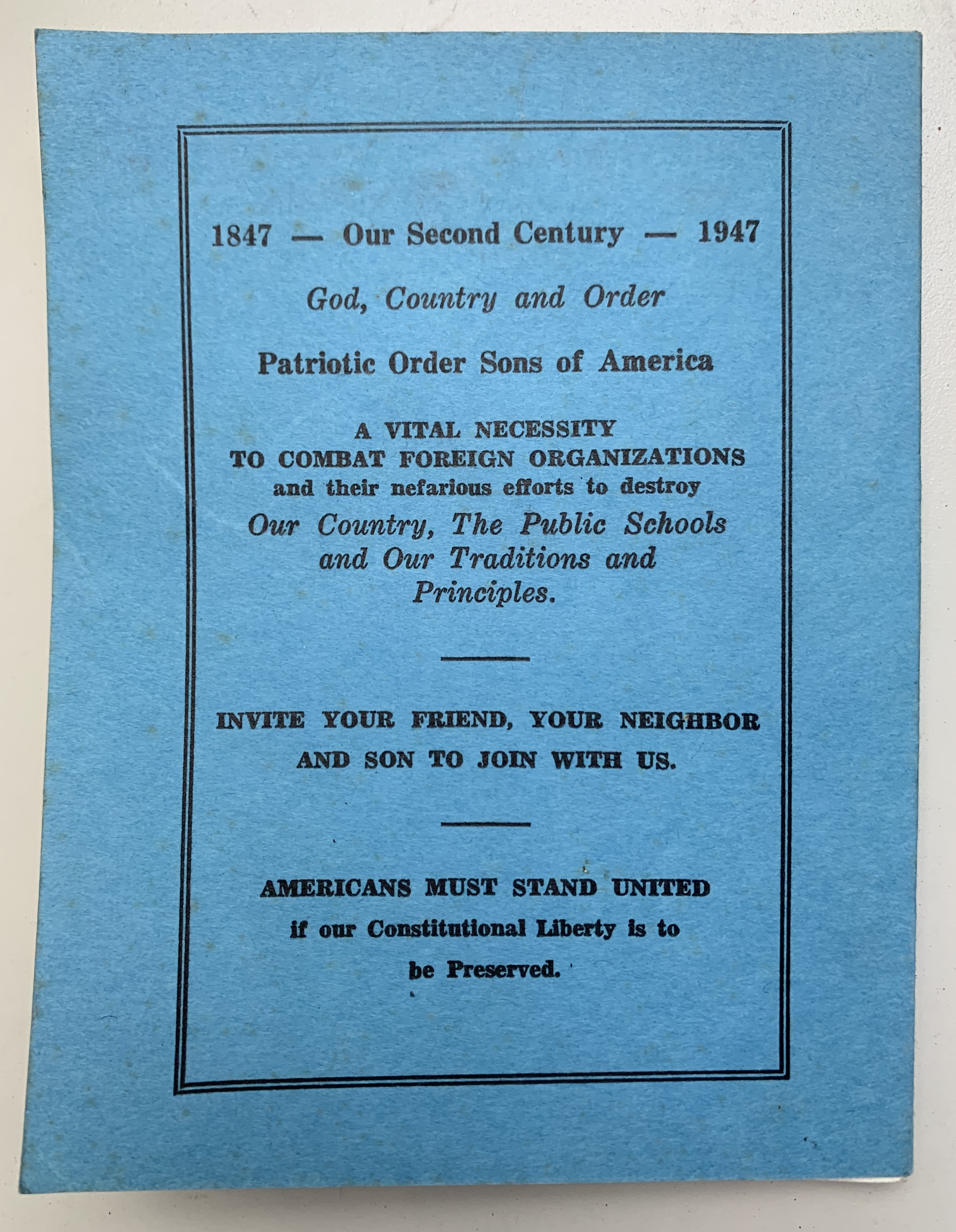
Back cover of the 1946 P. O. S. of A. constitution and bylaws booklet.

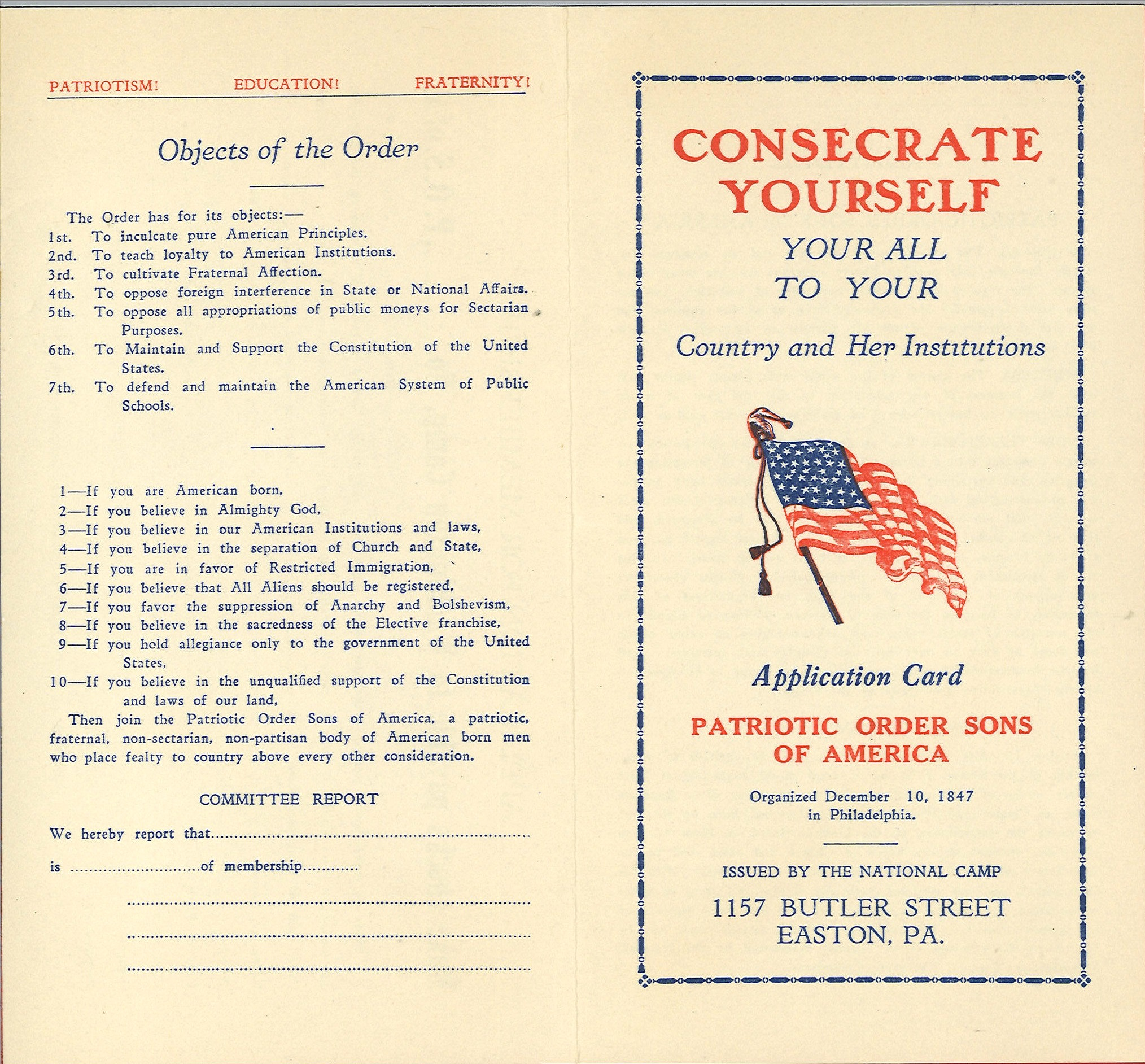
Cover of a 1934 P. O. S. of A. application card

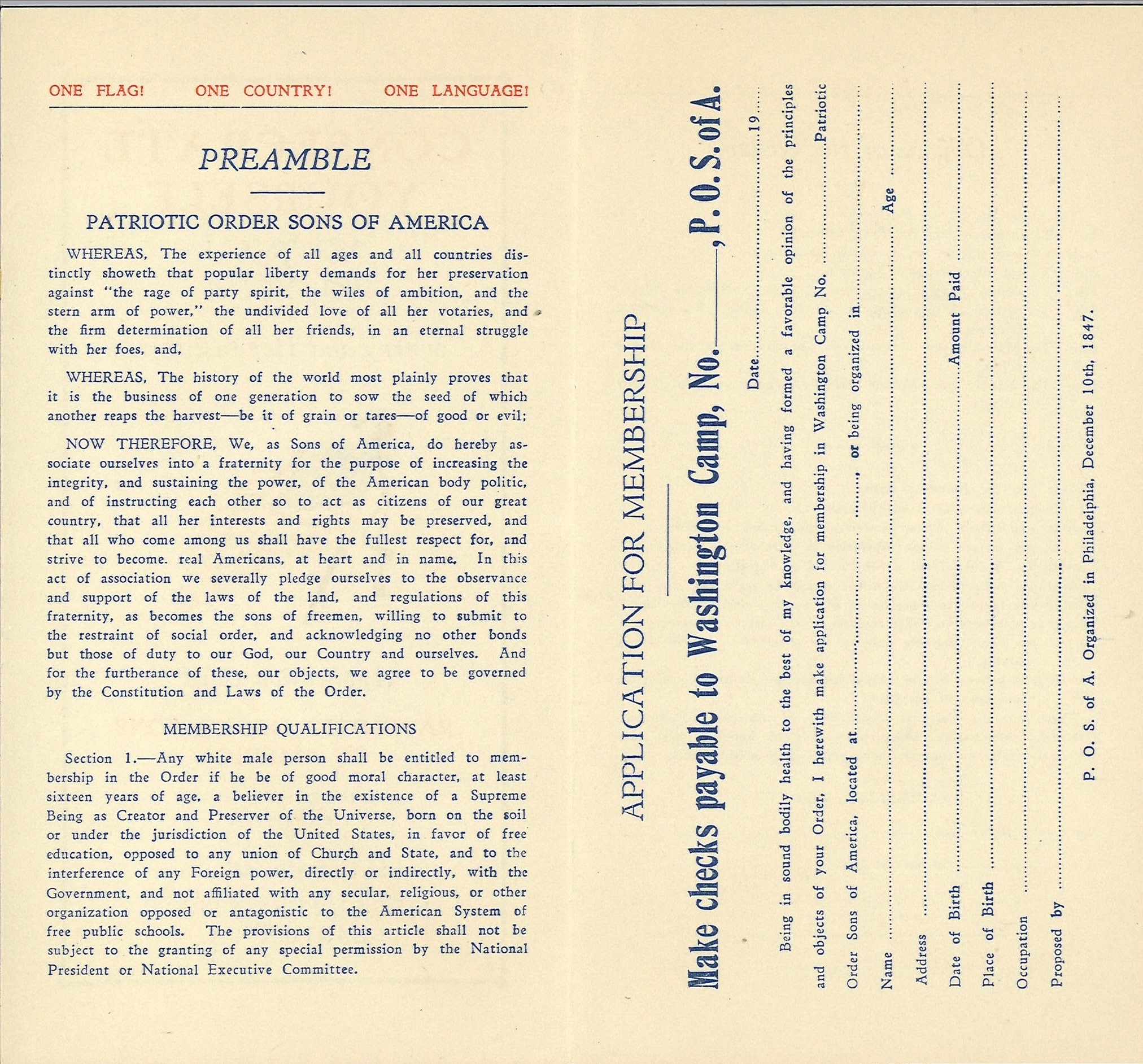
Inside of a 1934 P. O. S. of A. application card

== Platform of Principles, 1933 ==
From its origin in 1847, the P.O.S. of A. has been distinguished by its wariness of unrestrained immigration and its support of free public education for all. These distinctive features can be seen in its "Platform of Principles" adopted in 1933. The 1933 platform emphasized several core tenets:

Patriotism: Defining loyalty to the country as a high noble affection and essential for safeguarding national institutions.

Governance: Expressing a preference for the American form of government and opposition to "un-American" sentiments or foreign control.

Education: Supporting the free public school system as a "bulwark of liberty," while opposing sectarian or foreign influences in schools.

Immigration: Demanding restrictions on immigration based on physical, mental, and moral grounds rather than race or creed.

== Race and the P.O.S. of A. ==
The Order's constitution, as of 1934 and 1946, contained the following language:

MEMBERSHIP QUALIFICATIONS. Section 1.—Any American male person shall be entitled to membership in the Order if he be of good moral character, at least sixteen years of age, a believer in the existence of a Supreme Being as Creator and Preserver of the Universe, born on the soil or under the jurisdiction of the United States, in favor of free education, opposed to any union of Church and State, and to the interference of any Foreign power, directly or indirectly, with the Government, and not affiliated with any secular, religious, or other organization opposed or antagonistic to the American System of free public schools. The provision of this article shall not be subject to the granting of any special permission by the National President or National Executive Committee.

While the above language does not mention race at all, some believe it was for white males only. Today, the order welcomes American citizens of all races.

== Mission statement, circa 2019 ==
The public website of the National Patriotic Order Sons of America contains the following mission statement:

We support and pledge to defend the Constitution of the United States and the rights of every citizen to enjoy the liberties set forth in that document. To that end, we encourage the preservation of historic landmarks for the benefit of present and future patriots, so that they may never forget the sacrifices of our founding fathers and the patriots who continue to serve and defend this great nation. We also support the education of all citizens and teach respect and proper care of the American Flag.

== See also ==
- Bernard J. Cigrand
- List of fraternal organizations
- Nativism (politics)
