= Reynell Coates =

American physician

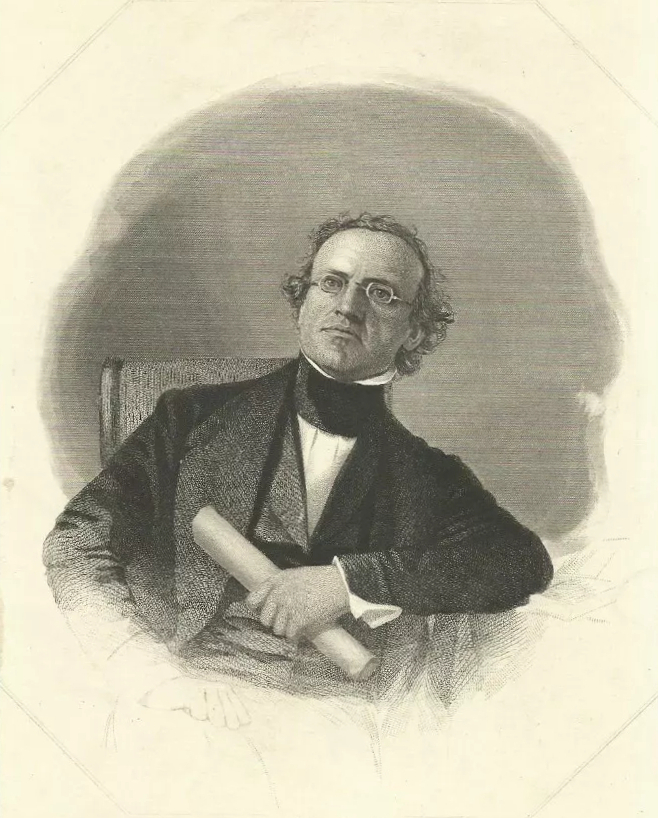
Coates in an undated engraving

Reynell Coates (December 10, 1802 in Philadelphia, Pennsylvania – April 27, 1886 in Camden, New Jersey) was an American medical doctor, scientist, teacher, poet and politician.

Reynell Coates was born in Philadelphia, Pennsylvania, the youngest son of philanthropist Samuel (1748–1830) and Amy (née Hornor) Coates, and grandson of Samuel and Mary (Langdale) Coates. At an early age, he became proficient in mathematics and languages, and studied medicine and surgery at Pennsylvania Hospital, where at age fifteen he became an apprentice of Dr. Benjamin Rush. He was graduated from the medical department of the University of Pennsylvania in 1823 with a thesis on "Fractures of Inferior Extremities", and became resident physician at the hospital. The same year he voyaged to India as a ship's surgeon and made an extended entomological tour. In 1829 he accepted the chair of natural sciences at Allegheny College. Joining the U.S. Navy as surgeon, he made during a cruise a collection that furnished the material for a large volume. He was a member of the scientific corps of the first South Sea expedition under Commodore Thomas ap Catesby Jones in 1835–36, and had charge of the department of comparative anatomy, but left the service on the return of the expedition.

== Politics ==
He was also active in politics. He was the author of the national address of the Native American Party in 1844, and the originator of the Patriotic Order Sons of America December 10, 1847, and wrote its ritual. In the national election of 1852 he was the candidate of the Native American Party for vice-president of the United States, on the ticket with Jacob Broom, for president.

== Medical and scientific contributions ==
Coates contributed voluminously to various medical and scientific journals, many of them being translated into the French, German, Spanish and Italian languages. He published Physiology for Schools (1840)—the first work of its kind—and Natural Philosophy for Schools (1845); besides other works. He wrote a monograph on "Hereditary Haemorrhage".

== Literary contributions ==
He was the editor of Graham's Magazine and contributed to the other literary journals of the time, both in prose and in verse. From 1845, he edited Leaflets of Memory: An Illuminated Annual, an annual illustrated collection of short stories and verse, of which eleven volumes are known. Of his poems "The Gambler's Wife" (1846), "Christian Charity" and "The Drunkard's Child" were best known.

== Family ==
He was married on December 5, 1827, to Margaretta, daughter of William Abbott of New Jersey, and his only child died in infancy. In 1845, after the death of his wife and child, Coates moved to Camden, New Jersey, where he died in 1886. He was buried in Upper Darby Township, Pennsylvania.
