= Washington's Headquarters (Valley Forge) =

Historic house in Pennsylvania, United States

- U.S. National Register of Historic Places
- U.S. National Historic Landmark
- U.S. National Historic Landmark District – Contributing property
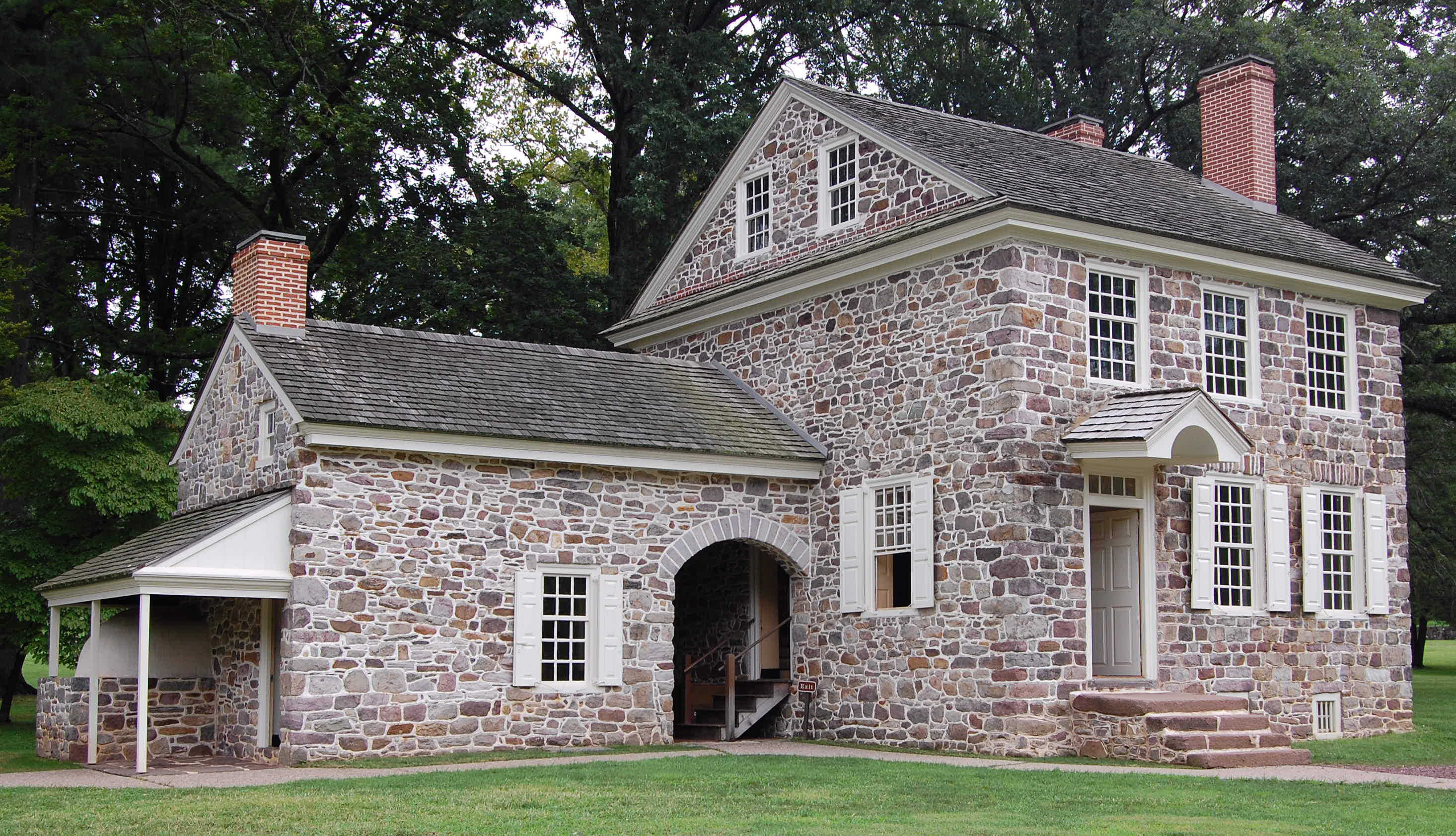
- Washington's Headquarters at Valley Forge

- Location within Pennsylvania Location within the United States
- Location: Valley Forge National Historical Park
- Nearest city: Valley Forge, Pennsylvania, U.S.
- Coordinates: 40°6′5″N 75°27′43″W
- Architect: Potts, Isaac
- Architectural style: Georgian
- Part of: Valley Forge (ID66000657)
- NRHP reference No.: 73001655

Significant dates
- Washington's home: 1777
- Added to NRHP: February 11, 1973
- Designated NHL: November 28, 1972
- Designated NHLDCP: January 20, 1961

Washington's Headquarters at Valley Forge, also known as the Isaac Potts House, is a historic house that served as General George Washington's headquarters at Valley Forge during the American Revolutionary War. The building, which still stands, is one of the centerpieces of Valley Forge National Historical Park in the Philadelphia metropolitan area.

The house was built about 1773, and Washington made it his headquarters during the Continental Army encampment between December 1777 and June 1778. The restored building is part of Valley Forge National Historical Park and is open to the public. It was designated a National Historic Landmark in 1972.

The house is located in present-day Upper Merion Township, Pennsylvania.

== Description and history ==
Washington's Headquarters at Valley Forge are located between PA Route 23 and the Schuylkill River in Valley Forge National Historical Park. It is a two-and-a-half-story three-bay Georgian vernacular stone structure with a full cellar and a side gable roof. A one-and-a-half-story ell extends to the left. The main entrance is in the left-most bay, sheltered by a gabled hood. There is a secondary entrance on the right end wall. The gable ends have pent roofs below, and a circular window on the north wall. The interior is decorated with period 18th-century antique and reproduction furnishings representative of what George Washington would have had at the house.

The house was built at some point between 1757–73 by a member of the Potts family, a Quaker family who operated iron forges, saw mills, and a grist mill nearby. George Washington, and later his wife Martha as well, occupied this house from late December 1777 until June 18, 1778. Washington conducted the army's business in an office on the ground floor during that period. The house became part of Valley Forge State Park in 1905, which was given to the people of the United States by Pennsylvania in 1976.

The Centennial and Memorial Association of Valley Forge, led by Founding Regent Anna Morris Holstein, was incorporated in 1878 with the purpose of saving, acquiring, preserving General Washington's Headquarters and immediate surrounding acreage. A large Centennial event to create awareness and raise funds was held on June 19, 1878, the 100th anniversary of Washington's Army exiting Valley Forge.

== See also ==
- List of National Historic Landmarks in Pennsylvania, a full list of National Historic Landmarks in Pennsylvania
- List of Washington's Headquarters during the Revolutionary War, a list of the various headquarters used by George Washington during the Revolutionary War
- National Register of Historic Places listings in Montgomery County, Pennsylvania, a list of national historic places in Montgomery County, Pennsylvania
- Valley Forge, a description of the nine-month encampment of George Washington and the Continental Army from 1777 to 1778
- Valley Forge National Historical Park, the national historic park that presently commemorates the historical importance of Valley Forge in the Revolutionary War
- Valley Forge, Pennsylvania, the location of Valley Forge and the Valley Forge National Historical Park, in southeastern Pennsylvania
