= Centennial and Memorial Association of Valley Forge =

The Centennial and Memorial Association of Valley Forge was incorporated in Montgomery County, Pennsylvania in 1878, with the objective of saving, acquiring, restoring, and preserving General Washington's Valley Forge Headquarters and surrounding acreage as parcels of it became available.

== History ==
Led by founding Regent Anna Morris Holstein and her team, the initial awareness and fundraising campaigns began with a large celebration on June 19, 1878, to commemorate the 100th anniversary of departure of the Army of the Revolution from their winter quarters. Stock certificates were sold and other events planned to raise funds. Initial funds were used to acquire General Washington's headquarters from owner Hannah Ogden in 1878.

More acreage was subsequently purchased, original artifacts acquired, and necessary repairs and renovations done to restore the home to the time of the 1777–1778 encampment. Due to Anna's relationship with the Mount Vernon Ladies' Association, they were able to bring a tree from General Washington's home back to his Valley Forge Headquarters and plant it in his memory. These and other sustained efforts led to the State of Pennsylvania making Valley Forge the first State Park in Pennsylvania in 1893; tens of millions have enjoyed it since.

On July 4, 1976, the United States Bicentennial, U.S. President Gerald Ford visited Valley Forge Park, where he addressed the crowd and the nation on live television, and signed H.R. 5621, making Valley Forge an historical site and national park.
