= Anna Morris Holstein =

American organizational leader, civil war nurse and author

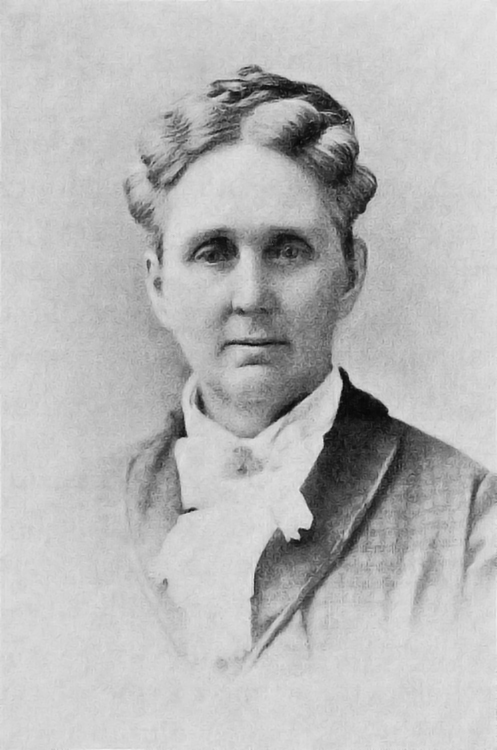
- Born: Anna Morris Ellis; April 9, 1824; Muncy, Pennsylvania, U.S.
- Died: December 31, 1900 (aged 76) near Bridgeport, Pennsylvania, U.S.
- Occupations: organizational founder, civil war nurse, author
- Spouse: William Hayman Holstein (m. 1848; died 1894)
- Relatives: Samuel Morris (great-grandfather)
- Writing career
- Pen name: "Mrs. H."

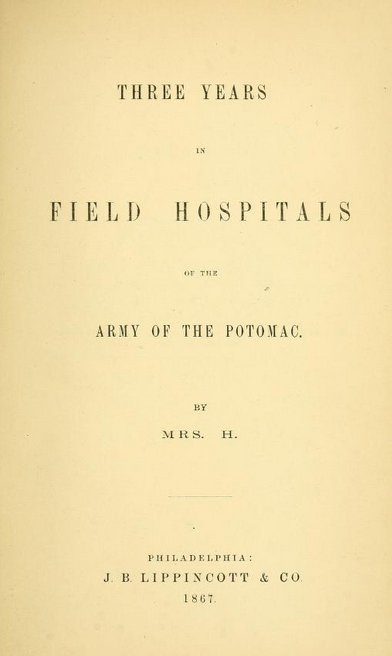
The cover of Three years in field hospitals of the Army of the Potomac, authored by Holstein in 1867 about her work with the Army of the Potomac during the American Civil War

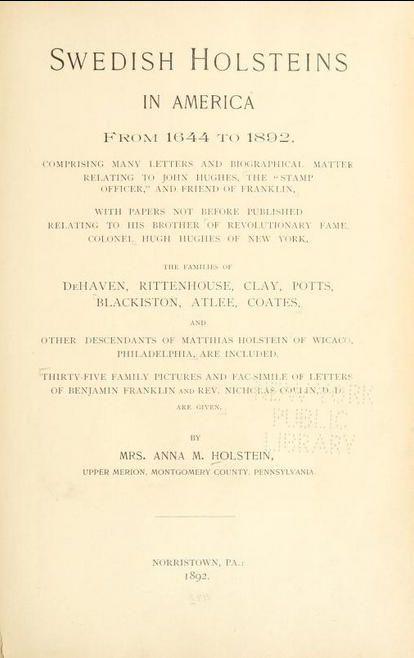
Swedish Holsteins in America, from 1644 to 1892, published in 1892

Anna Morris Holstein (née, Ellis; pen name, Mrs. H.; April 9, 1824 – December 31, 1900) was an American organizational leader, civil war nurse, and author. From 1862 until the close of the war, Holstein was engaged in the hospital service, and after the Battle of Gettysburg, she was matron-in-chief of a hospital in which 3,000 seriously wounded men were looked after. She was the founder and first regent of the Centennial and Memorial Association of Valley Forge, and a regent of the Valley Forge Chapter, Daughters of the American Revolution (D.A.R.).

Largely through Holstein's influence, George Washington was able to purchase his headquarters at Valley Forge, which have been restored and are now accessible to the people as a historic location. Her publications included Three years in field hospitals of the Army of the Potomac (1867), Swedish Holsteins in America from 1644 to 1892 (1892), and Valley Forge : Winter of 177–78 The Darkest Period of the Revolution (published posthumously, 1903).

== Early life ==
Ellis was born in Muncy, Pennsylvania, on April 9, 1824.

She was the daughter of William C. and Rebecca (Morris) Ellis. Captain Samuel Morris, her great-grandfather, was captain of the first city troop of Philadelphia, when it served as body guard to George Washington during the American Revolution, and was with George Washington at the Battles of Trenton and Princeton. He was known as the leader of the "fighting Quakers". Her grandfather, Richard Wells, though an Englishman of noble descent, was commissioned to provision the U.S. fleet on the Delaware River during the American Revolutionary War.

== Career ==
Holstein was with the Army of the Potomac the winter of 1862–63, in General Winfield Scott Hancock's corps. On June 14, 1863, she started with the hospital train, which was 20 miles in length at Fairfax Court House, when the army began moving north toward Pennsylvania.

When near the Old Bull Run battleground, she was advised by Hancock to proceed to Washington, D.C., and await the conclusion of the battle that Hancock knew was imminent. As soon as Camp Letterman, the general hospital at Gettysburg, was established, Holstein was made it matron-in-chief by Dr. Cyrus Nathaniel Chamberlain. The hospital had 3,000 wounded men.

Her served at Sharpsburg, Falmouth, Hancock's Division Hospital, Belle Plain, Port Royal, White House, and City Point in the American Civil War. In Annapolis, Maryland, she was assigned to care for the men who came from the prison pens. During any lull in army movements, Holstein worked with and for the Sanitary Commission throughout eastern Pennsylvania, where she met thousands of women, explaining the amount of work they could accomplish in helping aid wounded Union Army soldiers.

She and her husband sat near President Abraham Lincoln when he delivered his iconic Gettysburg Address, dedicating Gettysburg National Cemetery after the Battle of Gettysburg, the bloodiest battle of the Civil War.

Her experiences during the Civil War were narrated in a small volume she wrote, Three years in field hospitals of the Army of the Potomac. Her literary output also included, The Holstein Family History, her letters written in field hospitals. There were also shorter articles written for magazines and papers, including "Women of Montgomery County in War Time", an article published by the Historical Society of Montgomery County, of which she was a member.

The preservation of Washington's home at Mount Vernon was accomplished largely through her efforts, Holstein and her husband being among the first promoters of this project. It was also due largely to the efforts of Holstein that Valley Forge Centennial and Memorial Association was formed. She was the regent of this organization from its formation until her death. She was also one of the founders of the Valley Forge Chapter of the D.A.R. She was the first regent and filled that office until ill health compelled her to resign. Valley Forge being the scene of one of the most pathetic and important epochs of the Revolution, was ever a source of interest and reverence to her. She labored to preserve the headquarters used by Washington and to keep the name of Valley Forge prominent.

The Centennial and Memorial Association of Valley Forge, of which Anna was Founder and First Regent, was incorporated in Montgomery County Pennsylvania in 1878. Anna led them on their mission to save, acquire, restore and preserve General Washington's Valley Forge Headquarters and surrounding acreage as parcels became available.

To help create awareness and raise needed funds, they organized a large event that was held on June 19, 1878, to commemorate the 100th anniversary of the Army of The Revolution departing Valley Forge. Funds were used to purchase General Washington's Headquarters from Hannah Ogden. Subsequently additional acreage was purchased, original artifacts acquired, a tree from President Washington's Mt Vernon home was planted and renovations to restore the home back to 1777–1778 encampment completed. Those efforts led to the State of Pennsylvania making Valley Forge the first State Park in Pennsylvania in 1893.

Holstein again came into public service as a matron of the Pennsylvania Building at the World's Fair.

== Personal life ==
On September 26, 1848, she married William Hayman Holstein (1816–1894), whose ancestors also were prominent in the American Revolution. Much of her work was accomplished in cooperation with her husband. During the American Civil War, her husband enlisted in the 17th Pennsylvania militia and served until it was mustered out. Shortly after, on May 19, 1861, Holstein and her husband commenced a tour of hospital duty, which was continued until the end of the Civil War.

== Death and legacy ==
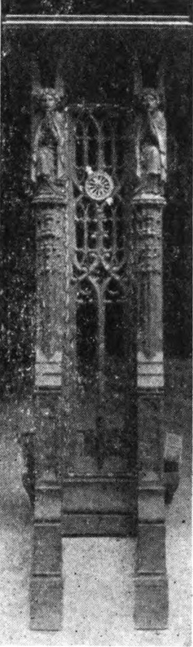
The Prayer Desk, a gift to the Washington Memorial Chapel by Daughters of the American Revolution in Holstein's memory

Holstein died at her home near Bridgeport, Pennsylvania, December 31, 1900. (Note: According to the obituary in The Allentown Leader (1901), Holstein died at Red Hill, near Norristown, Pennsylvania.)

In Holstein's memory, the Prayer Desk was given to the Washington Memorial Chapel by the Valley Forge chapter of Daughters of the American Revolution. It was dedicated June 19, 1916. The inscription was cut in brass and inlaid with pewter, and bears the arms of Washington, the Washington Memorial Chapel, the Diocese of Pennsylvania, and the insignia of Daughters of the American Revolution.

== Selected works ==
- Three years in field hospitals of the Army of the Potomac (1867)
- Swedish Holsteins in America from 1644 to 1892 : comprising many letters and biographical matter relating to John Hughes, the "stamp officer," and friend of [Benjamin] Franklin; with papers not before published relating to his brother of Revolutionary fame, Colonel Hugh Hughes of New York; the families of DeHaven, Rittenhouse, Clay, Potts, Blakiston, Atlee, Coates, and other descendants of Matthias Holstein of Wicaco, Philadelphia are included; thirty-five family pictures and facsimile of letters of Benjamin Franklin and Reverend Nicholas Collin, D.D., are given (1892)
- Valley Forge : Winter of 177–78 The Darkest Period of the Revolution. Washington Headquarters Centennial and Memorial Association Patriotic Order Sons of America. (published posthumously by W. H. Richardson; Anna Morris Ellis Holstein; Centennial and Memorial Association of Valley Forge. 1903)
