= David Hayes (sculptor) =

American sculptor, painter, and ceramics artist (1931–2013)

David Vincent Hayes
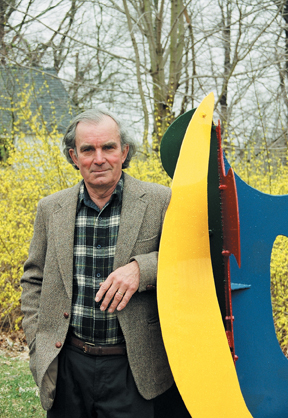
- Born: March 15, 1931; Hartford, Connecticut U.S.
- Died: April 9, 2013 (aged 82); Coventry, Connecticut, U.S.
- Education: University of Notre Dame, and Indiana University
- Known for: Sculpture, Painting
- Spouse: Julia Hayes (1934–2016)
- Awards: Logan Prize for Sculpture, National Institute of Arts and Letters, Fulbright award, Guggenheim Fellowship, Honorary Doctor of Humane Letters, Albertus Magnus College

David Vincent Hayes (March 15, 1931 – April 9, 2013) was an American sculptor.

== Life ==
Hayes received a Bachelor of Arts degree from the University of Notre Dame in 1953, and a M.F.A. degree from Indiana University Bloomington in 1955 where he studied with David Smith.

He received a post-doctoral Fulbright Award and a Guggenheim Fellowship. He was a recipient of the Logan Medal of the Arts for Sculpture and an award from the National Institute of Arts and Letters. During his life, he had over 400 exhibitions and his work is included in some 100 institutional collections including those of the Museum of Modern Art and the Guggenheim Museum in New York City.

In 2007, he was conferred an honorary Doctor of Humane Letters degree by Albertus Magnus College.

Hayes resided in Coventry, Connecticut, where he had 54 acres of land to exhibit his works on the grounds of the David Hayes Sculpture Fields, an open air art museum open to the public. He died of leukemia at his home there on April 9, 2013. He was 82.

In 2021, Hayes' work and grounds were the subject of an hour-long television broadcast shown on some 200 PBS stations nationwide produced by Legacy List with Matt Paxton.

== Work in public collections ==
Source: David Hayes Art Foundation archives

=== United States ===
- Detroit Institute of Arts; Detroit, Michigan
- Museum of Fine Arts; Houston, Texas
- University of Michigan; Ann Arbor, Michigan
- Arizona State University; Tempe, Arizona
- Carnegie Institute Pittsburgh, Pennsylvania
- Fleming Museum, University of Vermont; Burlington, Vermont
- First National Bank of Chicago; Chicago, Illinois
- Columbus Museum of Art; Columbus, Ohio
- University of Notre Dame; Notre Dame, Indiana
- Indiana University; Bloomington, Indiana
- Wichita State University; Wichita, Kansas
- Ohio Wesleyan University; Delaware, Ohio
- Hunter Museum of American Art; Chattanooga, Tennessee
- Wilbraham & Monson Academy; Wilbraham, Massachusetts
- Westmoreland Museum of American Art; Greensburg, Pennsylvania
- Philbrook Museum of Art; Tulsa, Oklahoma
- Western Michigan University; Kalamazoo, Michigan
- James A. Michener Art Museum; Doylestown, Pennsylvania
- Hartwood Acres; Pittsburgh, Pennsylvania
- University of Kentucky; Lexington, Kentucky
- Dubuque Museum of Art; Dubuque, Iowa
- Muscatine Art Center; Muscatine, Iowa

==== Connecticut ====
- Albertus Magnus College; New Haven, Connecticut
- Fairfield University Art Museum; Fairfield, Connecticut
- Hartford Public Library; Hartford, Connecticut
- Hartford Art School; West Hartford, Connecticut
- Housatonic Museum of Art; Bridgeport, Connecticut
- Manchester Community College; Manchester, Connecticut
- New Britain Museum of American Art; New Britain, Connecticut
- University of Connecticut; Storrs, Connecticut
- University of Connecticut Health Center; Farmington, Connecticut
- University of Hartford; West Hartford, Connecticut
- University of New Haven; West Haven, Connecticut
- Wadsworth Atheneum; Hartford, Connecticut
- Westminster School; Simsbury, Connecticut
- William Benton Museum of Art; Storrs, Connecticut

==== District of Columbia ====
- Smithsonian American Art Museum; Washington, D.C.
- George Washington University; Washington, D.C.
- Hirshhorn Museum and Sculpture Garden

==== Florida ====
- Boca Raton Museum of Art; Boca Raton, Florida
- Dade County Art Collection; Miami, Florida
- Frost Art Museum; Miami, Florida
- Gulf Coast Art Center; Belleair, Florida
- Lowe Art Museum; Coral Gables, Florida
- Von Liebig Art Center; Naples, Florida
- City of Fort Pierce; Fort Pierce, Florida
- Ringling Museum of Art; Sarasota, Florida
- Vero Beach Museum of Art; Vero Beach, Florida

==== Massachusetts ====
- Addison Gallery of American Art; Andover, Massachusetts
- Boston Public Library; Boston, Massachusetts
- Brockton Art Center, Fuller Memorial; Brockton, Massachusetts
- DeCordova Museum and Sculpture Park; Lincoln, Massachusetts
- Fitchburg Art Museum; Fitchburg, Massachusetts
- Gund Hall, Harvard University; Cambridge, Massachusetts
- Michele and Donald D'Amour Museum of Fine Arts; Springfield, Massachusetts
- Williams College Museum of Art; Williamstown, Massachusetts

==== New Hampshire ====
- Currier Museum of Art; Manchester, New Hampshire
- Dartmouth College; Hanover, New Hampshire

==== New York ====
- Elmira College; Elmira, New York
- Emerson Gallery, Hamilton College; Clinton, New York
- Everson Museum of Art; Syracuse, New York
- Harry Guggenheim Collection, Nassau County Museum of Art; Sands Point, New York
- National Trust for Historic Preservation, Nelson Rockefeller Collection; Tarrytown, New York
- Picker Art Gallery, Colgate University; Hamilton, New York
- University Art Museum, State University of New York; Albany, New York
- Yager Museum of Art & Culture, Oneonta, New York

===== New York City =====
- Brooklyn Museum; Brooklyn, New York
- Museum of Modern Art; New York City
- Solomon R. Guggenheim Museum; New York City

=== Europe ===
- De Porceleyne Fles; Delft, Holland, Netherlands
- Struktuur 68NV; The Hague, Netherlands
- Musée des Arts Décoratifs; Paris, France

== Solo exhibitions ==
Source: David Hayes Art Foundation archives

2024

- Vertical Motifs at the Bushnell Plaza; Hartford, Connecticut
- David Hayes Small Sculpture with curation by Robert Donston, South Windsor Public Library; South Windsor, Connecticut
- David Hayes Sculpture at the Peacock House Foundation; Fort Pierce, Florida
- Vantage Points, Sculpture Field Photos, Booth & Dimock Library Gallery; Coventry, Connecticut

2023

- Selection of Relief Sculpture, Spirol Art Gallery at CT State Quinebaug Valley; Killingly, Connecticut
- Remarkable Works Exhibition, Greenwood Glassblowing Studio Gallery and School; Riverton, Connecticut
- Vantage Points, Sculpture Field Photography at the Dye & Bleach House Gallery; Willington, Connecticut
- Fifteen Sculptures at the Busch Library; Annapolis, Maryland
- David Hayes | MAN OF STEEL: Selected Works from the Estate of David Hayes, Burgess Modern + Contemporary; Fort Lauderdale, Florida
- David Hayes Small Sculpture, Boccara Gallery; West Palm Beach, Florida

2022

- Sculpture in the Circle at the University of Hartford, West Hartford, Connecticut

2021

- You Gotta Have Art, a Legacy List with Matt Paxton hour-long documentary broadcast nationally on PBS
- David Hayes Outdoor Museum; Annapolis, Maryland
- Sculpture in Downtown Branford; Branford, Connecticut

2020

- Sculpture in Downtown Naples, City of Naples; Naples, Florida
- Sculpture in Danbury, Danbury Connecticut with CityCenter Danbury
- A Totem grows in Manchester, Town of Manchester Parks; Manchester, Connecticut
- Sculpture in Northeast Harbor, Mount Desert 365; Northeast Harbor, Maine

2019

- The Ventana Series, Muscatine Art Center; Muscatine, Iowa (exhibit travels)
- Sculptural Adornments: David Hayes Jewelry, Georgia Museum of Art; Athens, Georgia (exhibit travels)
- 24 Sculptures in Gainesville Parks; Gainesville, Florida
- David Hayes Jewelry, Fairfield University Art Museum; Fairfield, Connecticut (exhibit travels)
- Five large sculptures in Muscatine, Iowa; Muscatine Art in Public Places Commission

2018

- Outdoor Sculpture in downtown Winter Park, Florida; City of Winter Park, Florida
- The Ventana Series, Swope Art Museum; Terre Haute, Indiana (exhibit travels)
- The Ventana Series, Fort Smith Regional Art Museum; Fort Smith, Arkansas (exhibit travels)

2017

- Totem Sculpture, Anita Shapolsky Gallery; New York, New York
- Sabrina, Memphis Brooks Museum; Memphis, Tennessee
- Radio interview by Connecticut Public Radio's Diane Orson: Connecticut Sculptor David Hayes Transformed Steel Into Art.

2016

- Small Vertical Motifs, Commenoz Gallery; Key Biscayne, Florida
- Straight from the Barn, Emmanoel Lavagnolli Fine Art Gallery in Wynwood; Miami, Florida
- Small Sculptures and Gouache Studies, Center For Creative Education; West Palm Beach, Florida
- Small Sculpture and Gouache Studies, Lowe Art Museum; Coral Gables, Florida
- David Hayes Sculpture, The Perfect Provenance; Greenwich, Connecticut
- Small Sculpture, Arte Fundamenta; Wynwood, Florida
- David Hayes Sculpture, Isabella Garrucho Fine Art; Greenwich, Connecticut
- David Hayes Sculpture at the Dubuque Museum of Art; Dubuque, Iowa

2015

- Sentinel Sculptures at the Cummer Museum of Art and Gardens; Jacksonville, Florida
- David Hayes Sculpture at the Wichita Falls Museum of Art; Wichita Falls, Texas
- David Hayes Sculptures, Project Space Gallery, SUNY College at Oneonta; Oneonta, New York
- Large and Small, Hartford Public Library Gallery; Hartford, Connecticut
- Sculptures on Campus, SUNY College at Oneonta; Oneonta, New York

2014

- Small Sculptures and Gouache Studies, Wiregrass Museum of Art; Dothan, Alabama
- David Hayes Sculpture at the Jundt Art Museum; Spokane, Washington
- Maquettes and Gouache Studies at the Housatonic Museum of Art; Bridgeport, Connecticut
- Dragonfly: Sculpture at the Springfield Museums; Springfield, Massachusetts
- Recent Small Sculptures at M+V Art Gallery; Miami, Florida
- Small Sculpture at the Parmigiani Fleurier Gallery; Miami, Florida
- Sculpture at Northwood Village; West Palm Beach, Florida

2013

- David Hayes Sculpture, Contemporary Art Center; Peoria, Illinois
- David Hayes: A Sculptor of Space and Nature, Elizabeth Myers Mitchell Gallery at St. John’s College; Annapolis, Maryland
- Hanging Screen Sculptures at the Lutz Children’s Museum; Manchester, Connecticut

David Hayes dies April 9, 2013

- David Hayes Sculpture, Snite Museum of Art, University of Notre Dame; Notre Dame, Indiana
- Sentinel Sculptures at the Fort Wayne Museum of Art; Fort Wayne, Indiana
- David Hayes Sculptures at the Wiregrass Museum of Art; Dothan, Alabama

2012

- Small Sculpture, Gouaches, and New Totems, Garrison Art Center; Garrison, New York
- 20 Sculptures at the Art Museum at the University of Kentucky; Lexington, Kentucky
- Sculptures at the Westfield State University, Downtown Art Gallery; Westfield, Massachusetts

2011

- Sculpture at One North Broadway; White Plains, New York
- David Hayes Small Sculpture, George Waters Gallery, Elmira College; Elmira, New York
- Sculpture at Goodwin College; East Hartford, Connecticut

2010

- Art to the Avenue; Greenwich Avenue; Greenwich, Connecticut
- Fathers & Daughters, The Greenwich Arts Council Presents In The Bendheim Gallery; Greenwich, Connecticut
- Boscobel, in conjunction with the CURRENT show through the Garrison Art Center, Garrison, New York

2009

- Hayes Family Show: Three Generations. White Plains Library; White Plains, New York

2008

- David Hayes: 60 sculptures in White Plains, New York.

2007

- David Hayes: Sculpture. Vero Beach Museum of Art; Vero Beach, Florida
- Sculpture in Downtown Syracuse; Syracuse, New York
- The Lauren Rogers Museum of Art; Laurel, Mississippi
- Ross Art Museum at Ohio Wesleyan University; Delaware, Ohio – Small Sculptures, Drawings and Outdoor Sculpture

2006

- Louisiana State University Museum of Art; Baton Rouge, Louisiana – David Hayes Sculpture
- Erie Art Museum Annex Gallery; Erie, Pennsylvania – Small Sculptures and Drawings
- Longview Museum of Fine Arts; Longview, Texas – David Hayes Sculpture

2005

- 8 Vertical Motifs at the Mobile Museum of Art; Mobile, Alabama
- 12 sculptures on Oyaron Hill, Hartwick College; Oneonta, New York
- Maquettes and Drawings, Yager Museum; Oneonta, New York
- Small Sculptures and Drawings, Krasl Art Center; Saint Joseph, Michigan
- Sculpture in Erie: installation of sculpture in downtown Erie, Pennsylvania via the Erie Art Museum

2004

- David Hayes Sculpture at Florida International University, Biscayne Bay Campus; Miami, Florida
- Outdoor Sculpture, James A. Michener Art Museum; Doylestown, Pennsylvania
- Exhibition Without Walls; 40 sculptures in downtown Fort Pierce, Florida

2003

- Burt Reynolds Museum, Jupiter, Florida – Inaugural exhibition
- 5 Screen Sculptures at the University of Central Florida; Orlando, Florida
- David Hayes Sculpture, Sculpture Garden & Studio at Gidion’s; Kent, Connecticut

2002

- Lyric Theater; Stuart, Florida – Outdoor Sculpture
- Bradley International Airport; Windsor Locks, Connecticut – Small Sculptures

2001

- Geary Design; Naples, Florida: David Hayes Sculpture and Graham Nickson Paintings
- Lyric Theater; Stuart, Florida – Outdoor Sculpture
- Hanging Sculpture Commission: Stalagtite, Nicotra Group; Staten Island, New York

2000

- Sculpture at Sasaki, Sasaki & Associates; Watertown, Massachusetts
- Fordham University Downtown, New York: Wall Sculptures and Drawings
- David Hayes Steel Sculptures, Denise Bibro Fine Arts Inc.; New York, New York

1999

- Sea Forms, Hanging Screen Sculture Commission, Nicotra Group; Staten Island, New York
- Colgate University; Hamilton, New York: Sculpture in Scenic Landscape: Outdoor Sculpture, Wall Reliefs, Maquette and Drawings

1998

- Mercy Gallery, Loomis Chaffee School; Windsor, Connecticut
- 57 Sculptures in the City of Stamford, Downtown Stamford and Stamford Town Center; Stamford, Connecticut
- David Hayes Sculpture, Tremaine Gallery, Hotchkiss School; Lakeville, Connecticut
- Outdoor Sculpture, The Appleton Museum; Ocala, Florida
- Boca Raton Museum of Art; Boca Raton, Florida: Vertical Motifs, Drawings, Macquettes
- Paintings, Acrylic Landscapes and Studies, Stamford Center for the Arts, Rich Forum; Stamford, Connecticut

1997

- 100 Pearl Gallery; Hartford, Connecticut
- The Gallery, University of New Haven; New Haven, Connecticut
- Southern Vermont Art Center; Manchester, Vermont
- Screen Sculptures, Gulf Coast Art Center; Belleair, Florida (exhibit travels)
- Screen Sculptures, Orlando City Hall; Orlando, Florida (exhibit travels)
- Five Screen Sculptures, Hines Building; Boston
- Hayes Modern Gallery; Naples, Florida

1996

- Prudential Center; Boston
- Screen Sculptures, Gulf Coast Art Center; Belleair, Florida (exhibit travels)
- The Pingry School; Martinsville, New Jersey

1995

- Vertical Motif Installation, Boca Raton Museum of Art; Boca Raton, Florida

1994

- A Survey of Screen Sculptures, Anderson Gallery; Buffalo, New York

1993

- Appointed Board Member, New York Sculptors Guild
- Elaine Benson Gallery; Bridgehampton, New York

1992

- Elected Regent, University of Hartford; Hartford, Connecticut
- David Hayes—Outdoor Sculpture, Gallerie Françoise; Baltimore, Maryland

1991

- Monumental Sculpture Commission: Minotaur, Anderson Gallery; Buffalo, New York
- PBS Broadcast of The Sculpture of David Hayes, documentary film by Richard Byrnes
- Neville-Sargent Gallery; Chicago

1990

- Monumental Sculpture Commission: The Three Graces, School of Business, Western Michigan University; Kalamazoo, Michigan
- Welded Steel Sculpture with David Hayes, documentary film by Richard Byrnes
- Indiana University Art Museum; Bloomington, Indiana

1989

- Snite Museum of Art, University of Notre Dame; Notre Dame, Indiana. Exhibition travels to the University of Indiana.

1988

- Monumental Sculpture Commission: Griffon, Snite Museum of Art, University of Notre Dame; Notre Dame, Indiana
- Outdoor Sculpture, Station Plaza; Stamford, Connecticut

1987

- Monumental Sculpture Commission: Large Vertical Motif, Hartford Public Library; Hartford, Connecticut
- Juror, National Screening Committee, Institute of International Education, for Sculpture

1986

- Albertus Magnus College; New Haven, Connecticut
- Vertical Motif Series, Shippee Gallery; New York, New York

1985

- The Brooks File: David Hayes’ Sculpture Fields, Channel 3 WFSB; Hartford, Connecticut
- Visual Images Gallery; Wellfleet, Massachusetts

1984

- Visual Images Gallery; Wellfleet, Massachusetts
- Shippee Gallery; New York, New York

1983

- Relief Sculpture Commission, Wilbraham & Monson Academy; Wilbraham, Massachusetts
- Appointed Trustee, Hartford Art School, University of Hartford; Hartford, Connecticut
- Wesleyan Potters; Middletown, Connecticut
- Visual Images Gallery; Wellfleet, Massachusetts
- Rensselaer County Council for the Arts; Troy, New York

1982

- Juror, National Screening Committee, Institute of International Education, for Sculpture
- Relief Sculpture Commission, Albertus Magnus College; New Haven, Connecticut
- Sunne Savage Gallery; Boston, Massachusetts
- Visual Images Gallery; Wellfleet, Massachusetts
- Elaine Benson Gallery; Bridgehampton, New York

1981

- Monumental Sculpture Commission: Large Escargot, Hartwood Acres; Pittsburgh, Pennsylvania
- Bard College; Annandale-on-Hudson, New York
- Old State House; Hartford, Connecticut
- June 1 Gallery; Bethlehem, Connecticut
- Visual Images Gallery; Wellfleet, Massachusetts
- University of Maryland, Baltimore Campus; Catonsville, Maryland

1980

- Juror, Scholastic Art Awards, Connecticut, for Sculpture
- Juror, National Screening Committee, Institute of International Education, for Sculpture
- Bethel Gallery and Bethel Library grounds; Bethel, Connecticut
- Art Museum and City of Fitchburg; Fitchburg, Massachusetts
- Saratoga Performing Arts Center; Saratoga Springs, New York
- Sculpture on Campus, Skidmore College; Saratoga Springs, New York

1979

- Illustrated French Cooking for People Who Can’t by Julia Hayes; Atheneum Publishers
- Large Sculpture Commission, Lydall Corporate Headquarters; Manchester, Connecticut
- The Gallery, G. Fox and Company; Hartford, Connecticut
- White Mountains Center for the Arts; Jefferson, New Hampshire
- Plymouth State College; Plymouth, New Hampshire
- Sculpture in the Library, University Library, University of Connecticut; Storrs, Connecticut
- Mead Art Museum, Amherst College; Amherst, Massachusetts
- Outdoor Sculpture, Nassau County Museum of Art; Sands Point, New York

1978

- David Hayes: Sculptor; Channel 57 television documentary
- Screen Sculpture Commission, Moriarty Brothers, Inc.; Manchester, Connecticut
- Choate-Rosemary Hall; Wallingford, Connecticut
- Vertical Motifs, State University of New York; Albany, New York
- Manchester Community College; Manchester, Connecticut
- Sculpture on Tuck Mall, Dartmouth College; Hanover, New Hampshire
- Sculpture in the City, Museum of Fine Arts and City of Springfield; Springfield, Massachusetts

1977

- Monumental Sculpture Commission, Massasoit Community College; Brockton, Massachusetts
- Franz Bader Gallery; Washington, DC
- George Washington University; Washington, DC
- Georgetown University Hospital; Washington, DC
- Vertical Motifs, DeCordova Museum; Lincoln, Massachusetts

1976

- Sculpture for playground: Eagle; Killingly, Connecticut
- Sculpture in the City, Danbury, Connecticut

1975

- Everson Museum of Art; Syracuse, New York
- Brockton Art Center; Fuller Memorial; Brockton, Massachusetts

1974

- Outdoor Sculpture at Copley Square and Dartmouth Street Mall; Boston, Massachusetts
- Martha Jackson Gallery; New York, New York
- Columbus Gallery of Fine Art; Columbus, Ohio
- Sunne Savage Gallery; Boston, Massachusetts

1973

- Monumental sculpture commission, Centaur, Columbus Gallery of Fine Art; Columbus, Ohio
- Juror, Munson-Williams-Proctor Institute; Utica, New York – Annual Exhibition
- Illustrated Varmint Q by Charles Boer; Chicago: Swallow Press
- Juror, American Academy in Rome – Sculpture
- Munson Gallery; New Haven, Connecticut
- Sunne Savage Gallery; Boston, Massachusetts
- Albany Institute of History and Art; Albany, New York
- Gallery Five East; East Hartford, Connecticut

1972

- Appointed visiting artist, Harvard University; Cambridge, Massachusetts

1971

- Harvard University, Hunt Hall; Cambridge, Massachusetts
- New Britain Museum of American Art; New Britain, Connecticut
- Agra Gallery; Washington, DC

1970

- Monumental Ceramic Wall Commission, Elmira College; Elmira, New York
- University of Connecticut; Storrs, Connecticut
- Manchester Community College; Manchester, Connecticut
- St. Joseph’s College; West Hartford, Connecticut

1969

- Bard College; Annandale-on-Hudson, New York
- Willard Gallery; New York
- Arizona State University; Tempe, Arizona

1968

- Return to live in the United States
- Galerie De Haas; Rotterdam, Holland

1966

- Lyman Allen Museum; New London, Connecticut
- Houston Festival of Arts; Houston, Texas
- Willard Gallery; New York
- David Anderson Gallery; Paris

1965

- National Institute of Arts and Letters Award, New York

1963

- Represented United States at Forma Viva Sculpture Symposium, Portorož, Yugoslavia
- Root Art Center, Hamilton College; Clinton, New York

1962

- Retrospective Exhibition of Sculpture and Drawing, University of Notre Dame and Indiana University

1961

- Chicago Arts Institute; Chicago, Illinois – Logan Prize for Sculpture
- Post Doctoral Fulbright Fellowship for study in Paris. Guggenheim Fellowship awarded and arranged to follow Fulbright
- Willard Gallery; New York, New York

1960

- New Haven Festival of Arts; New Haven, Connecticut – Best in Show for Sculpture
- Sharon Creative Art Foundation; Sharon, Connecticut

1959

- Museum of Modern Art, New York – Recent Sculpture, U.S.A.
- Solomon R. Guggenheim Museum, New York – Animal and Young, part of inaugural exhibition
- Boston Arts Festival; Boston, Massachusetts – Drawing Award
- Lyman Allen Museum; New London, Connecticut
- New Talent Series, Museum of Modern Art; New York, New York

1958

- Silvermine Guild; New Cannan, Connecticut – Sculpture Award
- New Haven Festival of Arts; New Haven, Connecticut – Best in Show
- Wesleyan University; Middletown, Connecticut

1955

- Thesis Exhibition, Indiana University; Bloomington, Indiana

1955–1957

- United States Navy
