= Rankin Building (Columbus, Ohio) =

- U.S. National Register of Historic Places
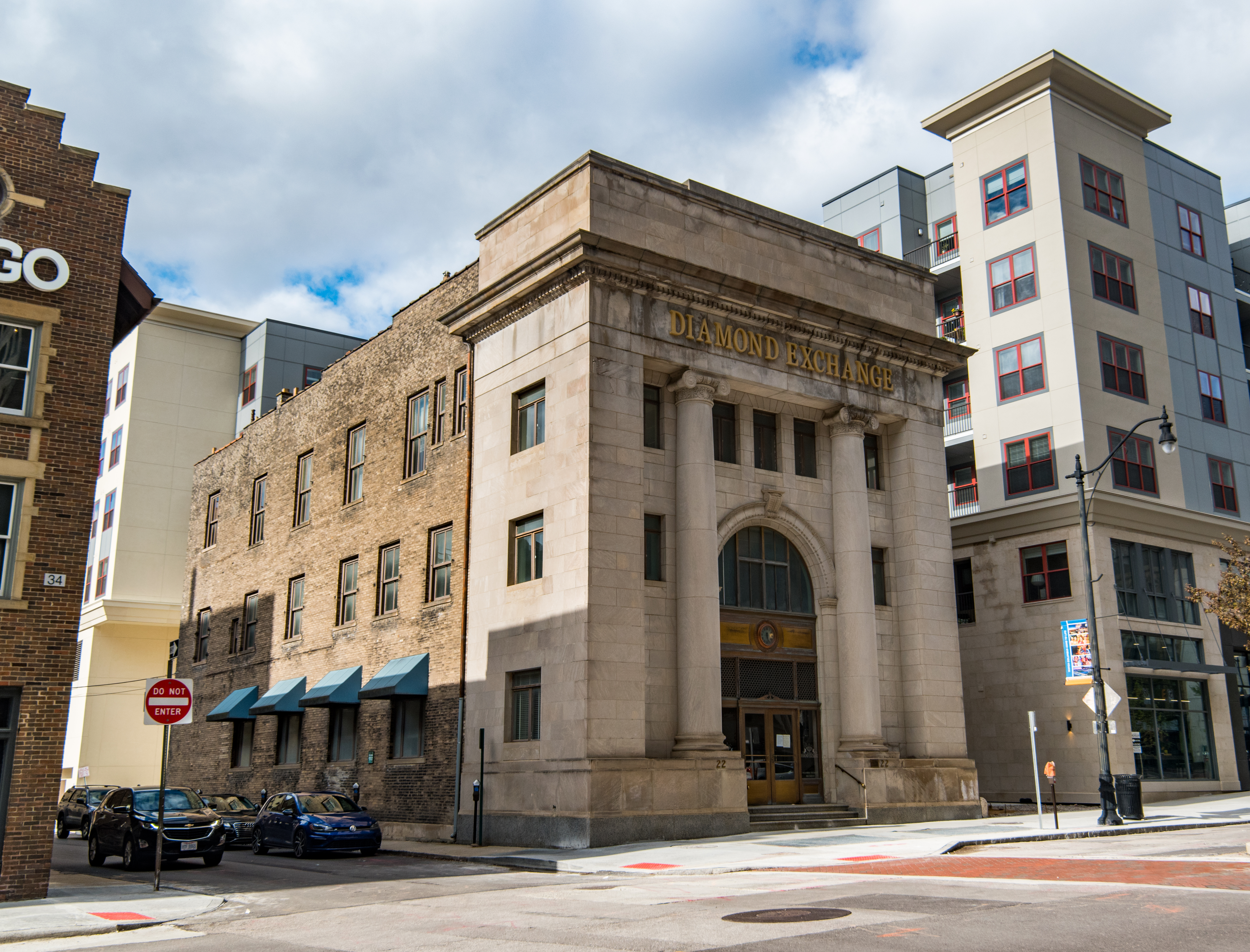
- Interactive map highlighting the building's location
- Location: 22 W. Gay Street, Columbus, Ohio
- Coordinates: 39.96377°N 83.00174°W
- Built: 1899
- Architectural style: Neoclassical
- NRHP reference No.: 82003570
- Added to NRHP: March 10, 1982

The Rankin Building is a historic building in Downtown Columbus, Ohio. The building was completed in 1899 by L.L. Rankin. It was built for the Buckeye State Building and Loan Co., which Rankin was president of. The company later moved down the street to the Buckeye Building. A Neoclassical facade was added in 1930 when it became the Union Building Savings and Loan Company building. It was listed on the National Register of Historic Places in 1982. The building's current tenant is the Diamond Exchange, a local jeweler owned by a former chair and current member of the city's Historic Resources Commission.

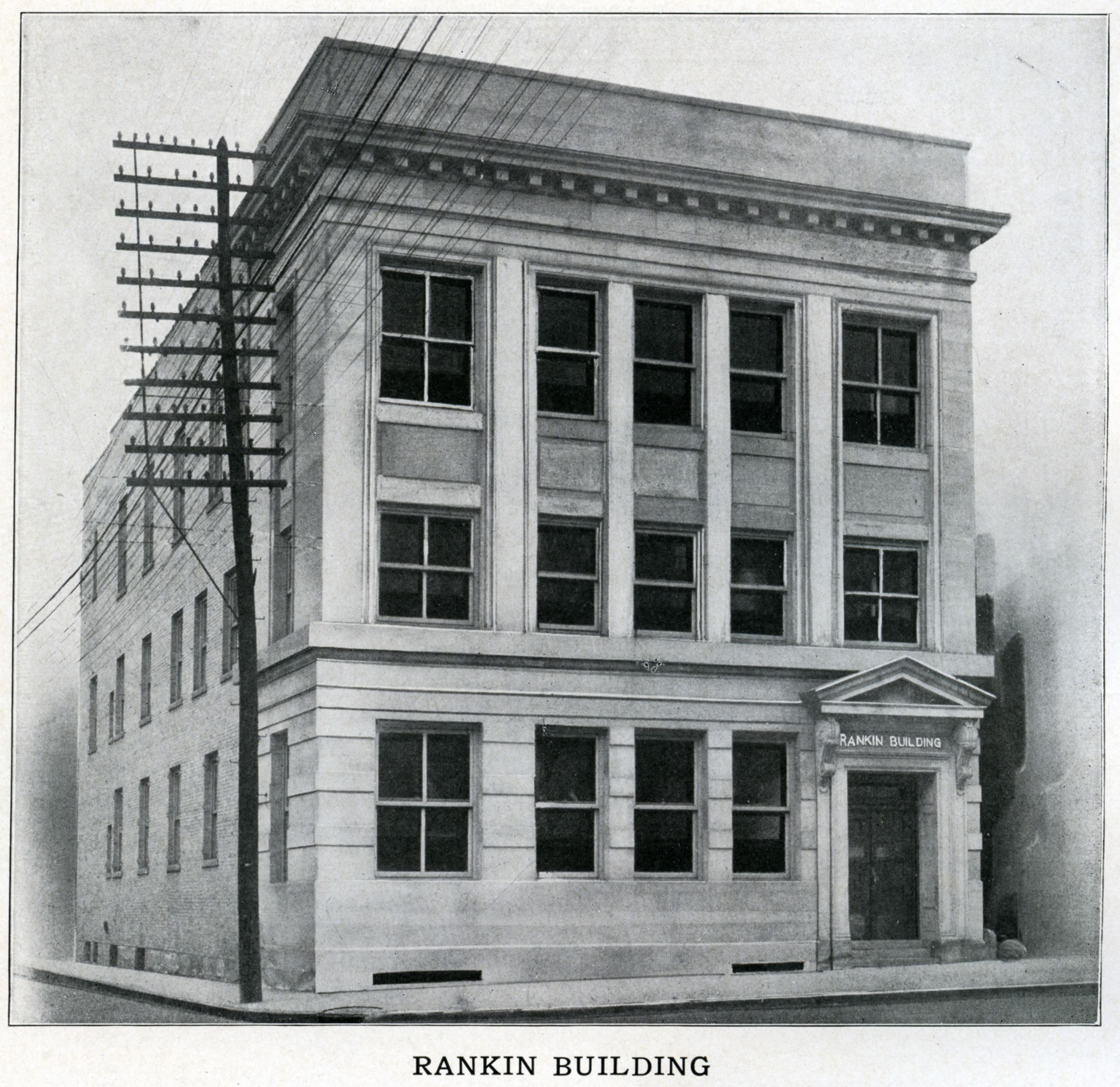
The Rankin Building in 1916, before the neoclassical facade was added in 1930.

== See also ==
- National Register of Historic Places listings in Columbus, Ohio
