= Alfred Hopkins =

American architect

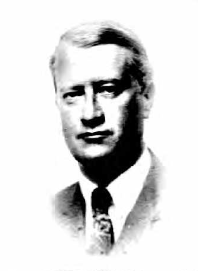
- Born: March 14, 1870; Saratoga Springs, New York, U.S.
- Died: May 5, 1941 (aged 71); Princeton, New Jersey, U.S.
- Occupation: Architect
- Spouse: Adelaide Spenlove (m. 1915)
- Children: Alfred Spenlove Hopkins; Peter Theodore Hopkins
- Parent(s): Alfred Hopkins; Mary Elizabeth Penfield

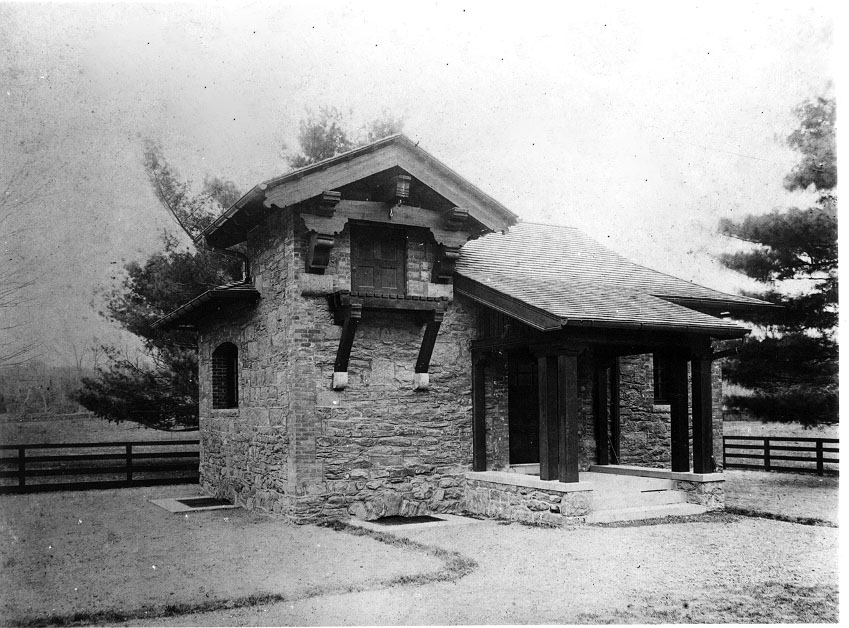
Dairy building for Frederick W. Vanderbilt's Hyde Park Farms, 1901, Alfred Hopkins, Architect.

Alfred Harral Hopkins (March 14, 1870 – May 5, 1941) was an American architect, an "estate architect" who specialized in country houses and especially in model farms in an invented "vernacular" style suited to the American elite. He was a member of the American Institute of Architects.

== Family and early life ==
Hopkins was born in Saratoga Springs, New York. His parents were Alfred Hopkins (1836-1884), a captain in the United States Navy, and Mary Elizabeth Penfield (1837-1898). They soon moved to Ohio where his parents gave birth to his brother Walter (b. 1879). Hopkins married Adelaide Spenlove (1894-1865) on June 30, 1915 in London, England. Following their marriage, Hopkins and his bride settled in New York City and had two sons—Alfred Spenlove Hopkins (1916-1995) and Peter Harrel Theodore Hopkins (1918-2004).

== Career ==
Hopkins studied at the Ecole des Beaux Arts in Paris followed by several years in Rome completing his knowledge of architecture, presumably in the early 1890s. By 1898, he returned to New York City and was practicing as an architect.

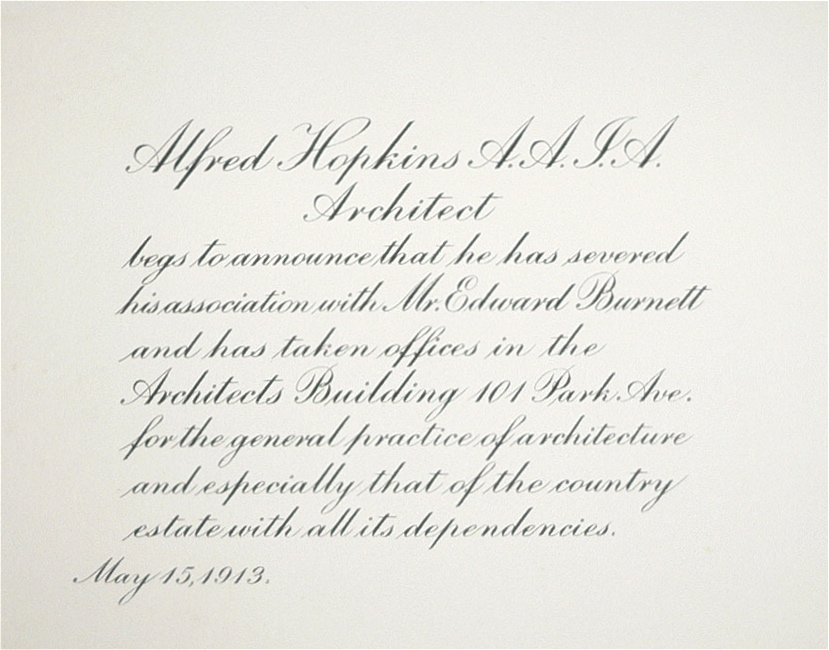
Alfred Hopkins announcing his new offices at 101 Park Avenue, New York City.

Early in his career, Hopkins specialized in the design of farming complexes for the American capitalist during the Gilded Age. By 1900, he was designing a new farm group for Frederick W. Vanderbilt in Hyde Park, New York in association with Edward Burnett (1849-1925), an agricultural specialist who earlier developed and managed the farming operations for other members of the Vanderbilt family. Hopkins and Burnett maintained an office at 11 East 24th Street in New York City. Together they designed some of the country's most extraordinary farms, including Foxhollow, the Tracy Dows estate in Rhinebeck, New York, and a farm for Harry J. Fisher in Greenwich, Connecticut. Their collaboration, though not firmly documented during this time, probably resulted in several other farm projects associated with Hopkins New York, New Jersey, and Massachusetts. Their work, particularly Hopkins architectural style, established the standard for farm architecture and influenced an entire generation of architects.

In 1913, he severed his association with Burnett and established himself as Alfred Hopkins & Associates located in the Architects Building at 101 Park Avenue in New York City. Hopkins continued specializing in gentlemen's farms, quickly establishing himself as the "dean of farm group architecture," due in no small part to the success of his Modern Farm Buildings, first published in 1913 (dedicated to Edward Burnett) and two subsequent editions (with the Burnett dedication omitted). Hopkins farm groups appeared in Westchester County, New York, the Hudson River Valley, northern New Jersey, Illinois. He designed no fewer than fifteen farm groups on Long Island, including the farm at Laurelton Hall for Louis Comfort Tiffany. An article on farm groupings published in Architectural Record in 1915 notes that Hopkins was often called upon to design the farm groups on estates where the residences were the work of other architects, such as Bertram Goodhue, John Russell Pope and Charles A. Platt.

Hopkins was among the contributors to Stables and Farm Buildings: A Special Number of the Architectural Review produced by the staff of Architectural Review in 1902. His Modern Farm Buildings served to publicize his practical and picturesque esthetic, and in common with all architects' publications since the sixteenth century, to attract clients. Hopkins' book went into a third edition.

Hopkins laid out his farm buildings around paved courts or grassed paddocks, keeping rooflines and eaves low to blend with the landscape, and carefully separating the necessary farming functions. He preferred to remove hay storage from its traditional loft over the stables to eliminate dust infiltration and ammonia pollution. Open-sided sheds housed farm vehicles. The spatial routes of cows and horses were kept separate. Farmhands' quarters were integrated with the buildings. An outstanding late survival of Hopkins' Cotswolds-inspired vernacular manner is the stable court at Hartwood, near Pittsburgh (1929). The same year he published a brochure distributed among architects, Two Cotswolds Villages, describing the vernacular architecture and stone-tiled roofs of two picturesque English villages: Bibury, Gloucestershire and Castle Combe, Wiltshire.

Hopkins is less known for his Prisons and Prison Building (New York: Architectural Book Publishing 1930), where rational planning met other ends, in a progressive and humane program based on the classification of prisoners and their segregation by groups in small units; proposals that argued against walled prisons and for the uplifting effect of good architecture. His practical experience was founded on his work at Westchester County Penitentiary, Berks County Prison, and his proposed designs for a federal prison to be built at Lewisburg, Pennsylvania, Lewisburg Federal Penitentiary, completed in 1934.

Hopkins was also among the architects who published plans for inexpensive carpenter-built housing in Carpentry and Building. and his small book Planning for sunshine and fresh air: Being sundry discourses & excursions in the pleasant art of building homes, set forth in a manner and upon a theory ... how best to effect their proper economies appeared in 1931.

In the 1920s and 1930s Hopkins was associated with architect John G. Dentz in the firm of Hopkins & Dentz, which developed a specialty in the design of large bank buildings, including the Buckeye Building in Columbus, Ohio and the Boji Tower in Lansing, Michigan. He published The Fundamentals of Good Bank Building in 1929.

After an interim following his death, an architectural firm was founded in 1954 by six associates from his office, as La Pierre, Litchfield & Partners.

== Some characteristic projects ==
- Hyde Park Farms, Hyde Park, New York, farm group for Frederick W. Vanderbilt, 1901.
- Elawa Farm, Lake Forest, Illinois, Neo-Georgian farm complex for A. Watson Armour, 1917, built as a weekend house Armour, an heir of the Armour and Company meatpacking fortune, lived on Lake Shore Drive in Chicago. The projected main house, designed by David Adler in neo-Georgian style, to which the farm group was expressly suited, was never built; instead paired gatehouses were linked to the farm group by extensive gardens. Low eaved pitched roofs and linking covered passageways characterize Hopkins' symmetrically-massed brick farm group at Elawa Farms.
- Hartwood, for Mr. and Mrs. John Lawrence, 1929. Lawrence's wife Mary was the daughter of Pennsylvania State Senator William Flinn, a construction magnate. The thirty-one room slate-roofed stone house constructed around a Great Hall and a picturesquely massed stable compound are in a Cotswolds vernacular Tudor style. Sold to the Allegheny Parks Commission in 1964 with 400 acres (1.6 km^{2}) of parkland and riding trails, the grounds are now enlarged to 629 acres (2.55 km^{2}); house and grounds are open to the public within Hartwood Acres Park.
- Farm group for Sen. Joseph Medill McCormick and Ruth Hanna McCormick, in Byron, Illinois, a dairy and cattle breeding farm.
- Sprawling lakeside estate and farm complex just north of Cooperstown, New York for William Telow Hyde known as Glimmerglen in 1916. The manor house, stables, dependency cottages, and sheep farm complex have since been razed. The estate was featured in Country Life magazine in late 1922. The stone gate house featured in the Architectural Record is extant today as is the boathouse and distinctive cottage known as the Winter House.
