= Hartwood Acres Park =

County park in Allegheny County, Pennsylvania

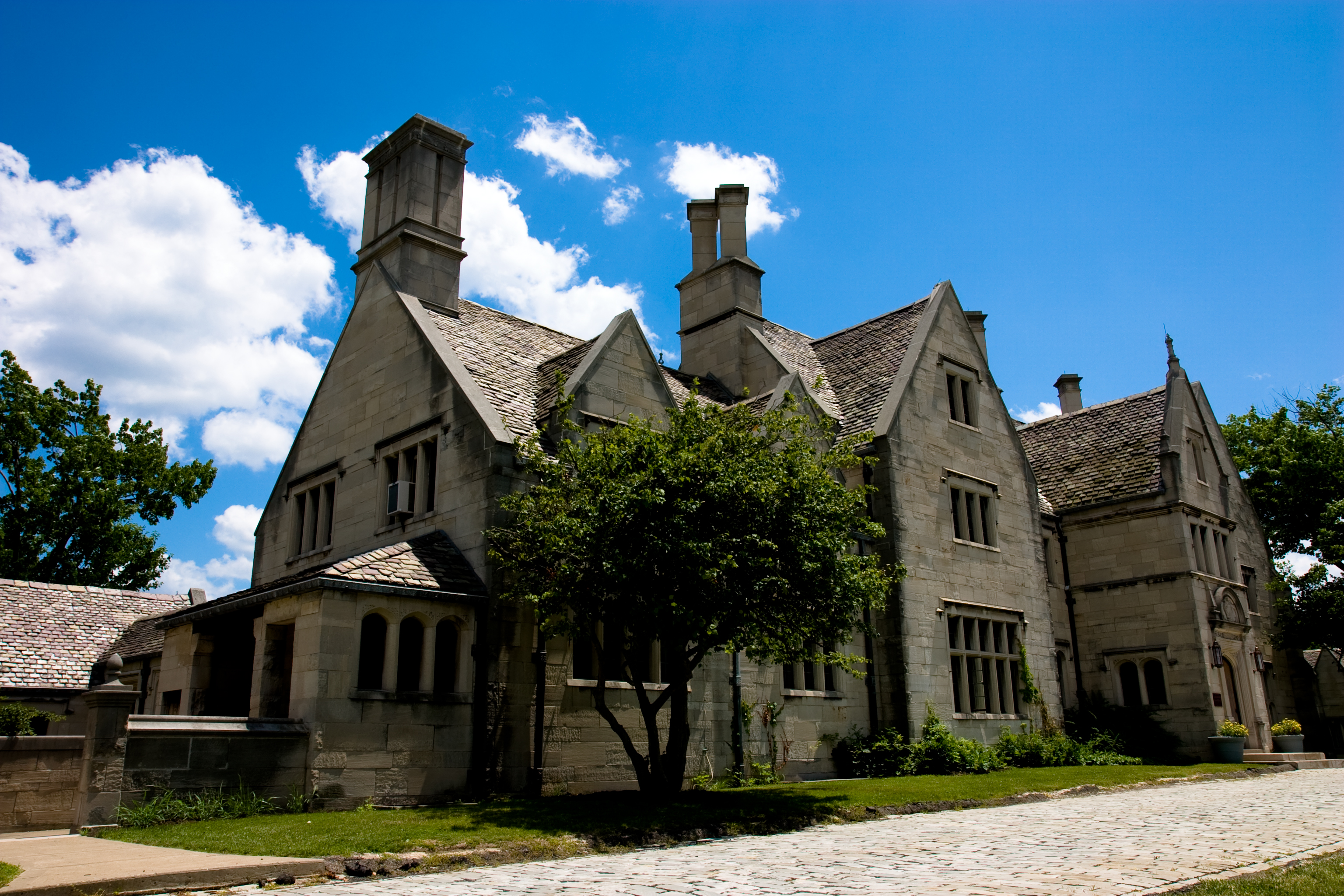
- Hartwood Mansion as seen from the northeast corner

- Location within Pennsylvania Location within the United States
- Type: Municipal
- Location: Allegheny County, Pennsylvania
- Coordinates: 40.568°N 79.917°W
- Area: 629-acre (255 ha)

Hartwood Acres is a 629-acre (255 ha) county park in Allegheny County, Pennsylvania in the United States. Hartwood is considered the crown jewel of the county's 12,000-acre (4,900 ha) network of nine distinct parks.

Purchased by the county in 1969, its special feature is one of the largest and most spectacular country estates in the region. Hartwood consists of a stately Tudor mansion (begun in 1927 and completed in 1929), an English style Formal Garden, a cottage, a stable complex, and a gate lodge (erected in 1927). The mansion, designed by Alfred Hopkins for John and Mary Flinn Lawrence, houses a collection of original English and American antiques.

Hartwood is sited 10 miles (16 km) northeast of Downtown Pittsburgh on largely forested land in both Hampton and Indiana townships. The park also offers a large-stage concert area where the Free Summer Concert Series is held, as well as the Allegheny County Music Festival, and 30 miles (48 km) of trails—horse riding, walking, hiking, biking, and cross country skiing. Hartwood is especially well-known because of its now-defunct "Festival of Lights," a large outdoor light display once held during the holiday season to benefit local charities.

== History ==
Mary Flinn Lawrence, a Pittsburgh philanthropist, created Hartwood with money she inherited from her father, Senator William Flinn. In the 1920s, she and her husband John Lawrence asked architect Alfred Hopkins to borrow design elements from a manor house the Lawrences had seen in Broadway, Oxfordshire, England. The result was a stately 31-room slate-roofed stone house constructed around a great hall.

Mary transformed the grounds of her estate into an equestrian arts showcase, building riding trails that extend for miles, show rings, steeplechase layouts, and ivy-covered stables. The stalls of the stables are made of varnished oak.

The Allegheny Parks Commission bought 400 acres (1.6 km^{2}) of land and riding trails from Mary (John died in 1945) in 1969, with several stipulations. 1) Mary was to be able to remain in residence until her death as were her servants, 2) The land would never be subdivided, and 3) the county would also purchase her sister Edith's home, which was called Harkaway Farm (This is now the area called the Middle Road Concert Area where the amphitheater is located). Mary died on October 29, 1974, and in 1976 the new park was opened to the public.

== Usage in popular culture ==
A large segment of the 1996 TV film The Christmas Tree, directed by Sally Field, was filmed at Hartwood.

Some scenes in the 2006 film 10th & Wolf were filmed in the Hartwood Mansion's great hall.

The pilot episode for the cancelled Twentieth Century Fox Television adaptation of Joe Hill's Eisner Award-winning graphic novel, Locke & Key, was filmed at the Hartwood Mansion in early 2011.

Scenes from the 2014 blockbuster The Fault in our Stars were filmed near the Middle Road entrance to the park.

Scenes from the 2022 Netflix film The Pale Blue Eye feature the Hartwood stables as well as exterior shots of the Hartwood Mansion.

== Sculpture ==
Eleven large, outdoor sculptures by nationally-known artists co-exist with visitors to the park as part of the permanent collection.

- Coronet, 1978, Lila Katzen
- Monumental Holistic Image IV, 1980, Betty Gold
- Ring Series #5, 1983, Fletcher Benton
- Cloudt, 1982, Ron Bennett
- Stretch, 1980–81, Charles Ginnever
- Hence, 1977, Clement Meadmore
- Manly, 1980, Lyman Kipp
- Large Escargot, 1982, David Hayes
- Mobius Trip X, 1966–83, Peter Forakis
- Large Snail, 1965, Tillie Speyer
- Hidden in the Obvious, Stanley Boyd Spotts
- Totem, Lamina, Limbus, 1979, Jack Youngerman

== Gallery ==
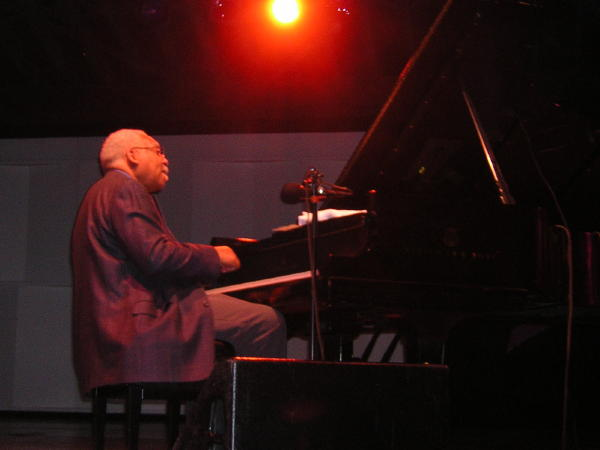
Ellis Marsalis Jr. in 2004

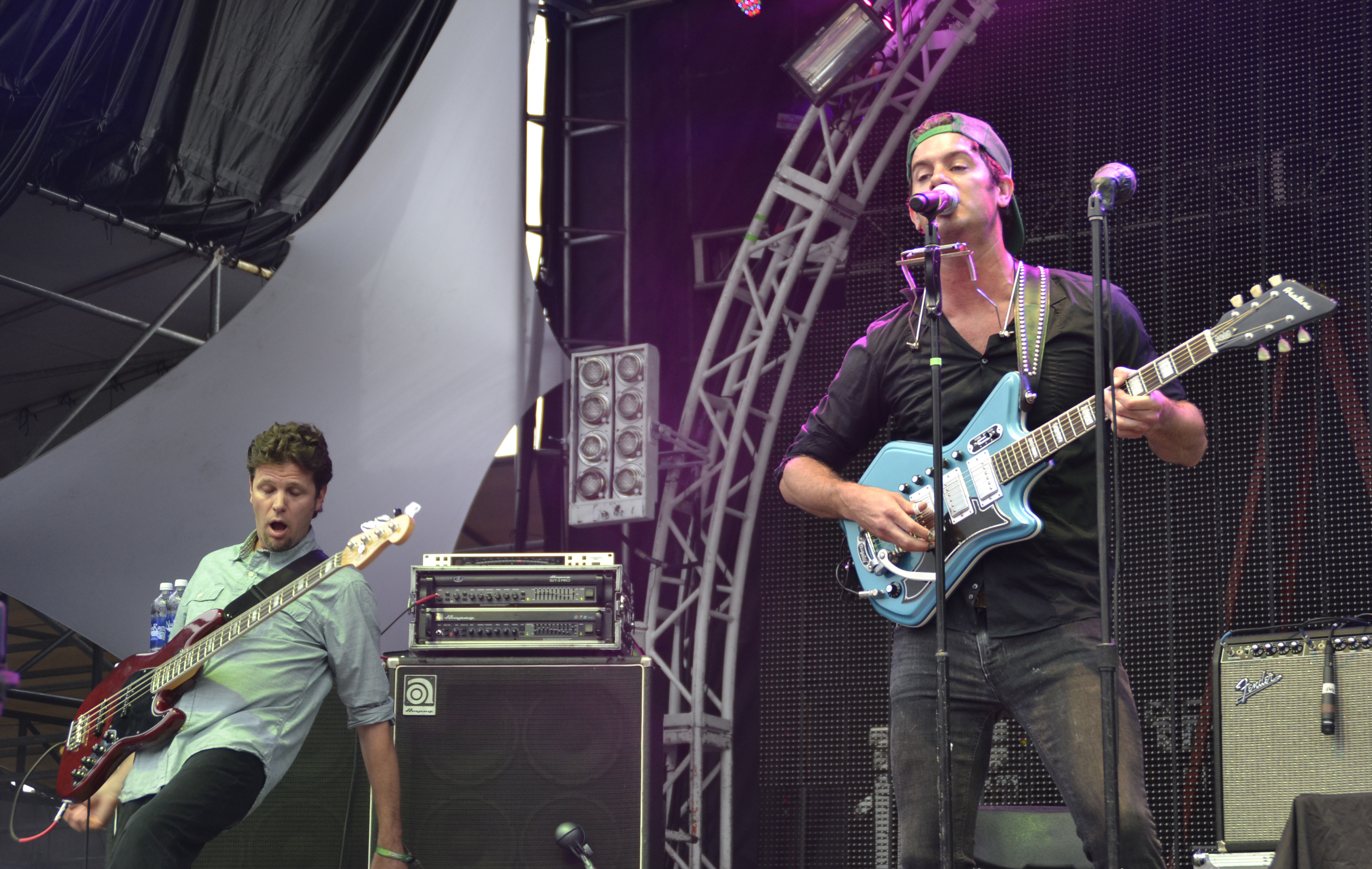
G. Love & Special Sauce in 2010

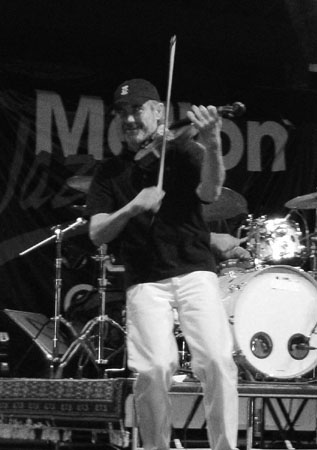
Jean-Luc Ponty in 2007

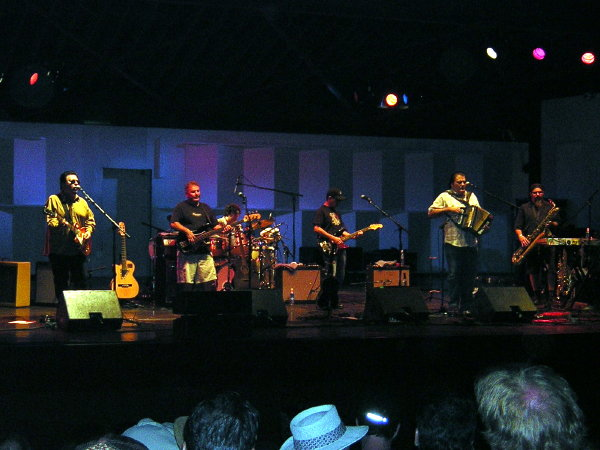
Los Lobos in 2005

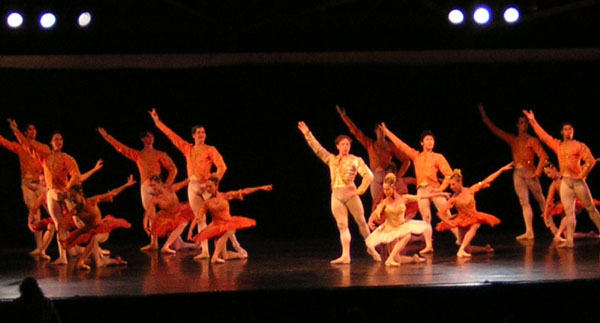
Pittsburgh Ballet Theatre in 2008

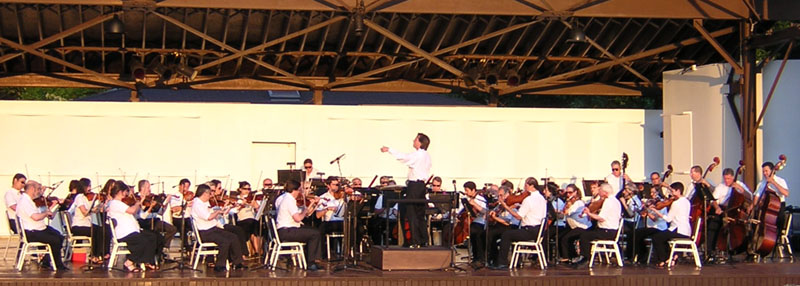
Pittsburgh Symphony Orchestra in 2007
