= Mary Flinn Lawrence =

American activist and philanthropist

Mary Flinn Lawrence (February 20, 1886 – October 29, 1974) was deeply involved in politics, activism and philanthropy her entire life. Daughter of Pennsylvania Senator William Flinn, and long-term supporter of the Republican Party, Lawrence was politically active throughout her life supporting women's suffrage and going on to make her own mark in politics, particularly in the area of electioneering and in appointed political positions. She was noted for her work on the Gifford Pinchot gubernatorial campaign in 1922. She was also a philanthropist, social reformer and a conservationist involved with more than 250 organizations. Her home, Hartwood, is now an Allegheny County Park.

== Early life ==
Mary Flinn Lawrence was born in 1877, the first of seven children by William Flinn and Nancy Galbraith Flinn of Pittsburgh, Pennsylvania. William co-owned a construction company Booth and Flinn that built many Pittsburgh landmarks including some well-known Pittsburgh tunnels such as the Mount Washington Transit Tunnel and the Liberty Tunnels. He rose through the ranks of the Republican Party serving as a ward boss, a member of the Pennsylvania state legislature, eventually becoming a state Senator. He was a personal friend of President Theodore Roosevelt and was the power behind the Flinn/Magee political machine that ran politics in Pittsburgh for two decades at the end of the 19th century.

Mary Flinn was raised at her family's estate on highland Avenue in Pittsburgh. Educated at the Thurston School in Pittsburgh and then at Briarcliff College, she started her benevolent work raising funds for the city's Industrial Home for Crippled Children. Influenced by her father's involvement in politics, in 1904, she helped found the Allegheny County Equal Franchise Federation.

== Suffrage, activism and philanthropy ==
She engaged in a wide variety of philanthropic activities throughout her lifetime supporting more than 250 organizations including the Red Cross, The Home for Convalescent Mothers and Babies, the Pittsburgh Symphony Society, the YWCA, the Twentieth Century Club and many others. Conservation was another of her key interests. She was the second woman to serve on the Pennsylvania State Forestry Commission, appointed in 1920 and serving under three governors. She also served on the advisory committee of the Pennsylvania Parks Association and on the Garden Club Federation of Pennsylvania.

She was especially active in the area of suffrage and politics. Alongside Jennie Bradley Roessing, Mary Bakewell, and Lucy Kennedy and Eliza Kennedy Smith, she organized the Allegheny County Equal Franchise Federation, an organization she went to serve as President in 1912. In 1911, she was one of four Pittsburgh delegates to the National Women's Suffrage Convention. One of Lawrence's major activities during the suffrage movement was lobbying politicians for the vote, specifically to support a constitutional suffrage amendment.

During World War I she worked with other Pittsburgh suffragettes to form the Suffrage Red Cross, an association that lobbied for the vote while undertaking traditional Red Cross work such as fundraising, organizing supplies, and nursing. With the passing of the 19th amendment, suffrage efforts transformed into voter support efforts with the founding of the Allegheny County League of Women Voters. She was also appointed by the governor to serve on the Women's Republican Committee of Pennsylvania and served on the Pennsylvania State Council of Republican Women. Within this organization she worked with Gifford Pinchot to enact election reform focused on corrupt election practices.

This work, and her personal friendship with Cornelia Bryce Pinchot, led to her supporting Gifford Pinchot in his successful 1922 gubernatorial election. Her involvement in this successful campaign drew national attention with one North Carolina paper reporting "Woman's Hand Directs Crushing Blow, Wrecks Political Machine." It also led to her appointment as Secretary of the Commonwealth, as one of two women in Pinchot's cabinet. She later served as Chief State Forester under Governor William Sproul. She continued to work with a number of Republican organizations and to support campaigns including that of Presidential hopeful Alf Landon against Franklin Delano Roosevelt in 1936.

== Personal life ==
Mary Flinn married John Lawrence, an employee of the London and Liverpool Globe Insurance Company who had ties to her father's construction firm, in 1914. John Lawrence served in both World War I and World War II. The couple adopted two sons - John (in 1938) and William (in 1941). Because both of her sons were adopted, at the time of her death in 1978, there was a contentious estate case connected to a trust that had been set up in her name by her father in 1923. Eventually reaching the Supreme Court of Pennsylvania, the case focused on the issue of the status of adopted children when it came to inheritance.

In addition to the trust, at the time of Mary's father's death in 1924, she received a large inheritance that she used to fund the purchase of the Hartwood property where the family built a Tudor mansion and riding stables. Because of their interest in conservation, the Lawrences made several notable changes to the property, for example planting 96,000 pine tree seedlings to address soil conservation. She also hired the first licensed female architect, Rose Greely, to design the property landscape in 1938. This large estate with formal gardens and riding trails encompassed several hundred acres and was eventually purchased by the Allegheny Parks Commission and was opened for public use in 1976.

Mary Lawrence died October 29, 1974 and was buried in Homewood Cemetery. Her personal papers, including an extensive collection of letters chronicling both Pittsburgh life and World War I, are held at the Heinz History Center.
