= William Flinn =

American politician

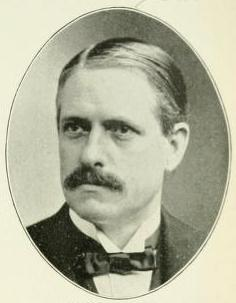

Member of the Pennsylvania Senate from the 44th district
- In office January 6, 1891 – March 7, 1902
- Preceded by: John C. Newmyer
- Succeeded by: William S. Woods

Member of the Pennsylvania House of Representatives from the Allegheny County district
- In office January 2, 1877 – May 9, 1889

Personal details
- Born: May 26, 1851 Manchester, England
- Died: February 19, 1924 (aged 72) St. Petersburg, Florida
- Party: Progressive (after July 1912)
- Other political affiliations: Republican (before July 1912)
- Spouse: Nancy Galbraith
- Children: Seven

William Flinn (1851–1924) was a powerful political boss and construction magnate in Pittsburgh, Pennsylvania, United States. Along with Christopher Magee (1848–1901), his political partner, the two ran the Republican Party machine that controlled the city for the final twenty years of the 19th century.

== Early life ==
He was born in Manchester, England, on May 26, 1851, to John Flinn, an Irish immigrant, and Mary Hamilton Flinn, an Englishwoman by birth. The family emigrated later that year to the United States and settled in Pittsburgh's Sixth Ward, famous for its hard-scrabble politics, where his father established a small contracting business.

Educated in the Pittsburgh Public Schools, Flinn dropped out at age 9 to deliver newspapers, shine shoes, and later apprentice in the gas and steam fitting trades.

== Politics ==
Flinn became politically active in the Republican Party as a ward boss collecting stray votes. He soon attained office in 1877 as a member of the Board of Fire Commissioners. Flinn quickly partnered with Christopher Magee, the city's Republican Party political boss. In 1877, he was elected to the State House to represent the Pittsburgh area by holding one of Allegheny County's allotted at-large seats. In 1882, Flinn was appointed chairman of the executive committee of the Pittsburgh Republican party, a position he held for the next 20 years, and in 1890 he was elected to the Pennsylvania State Senate, where he sponsored the Good Roads Act, which became law in 1895. He remained there until his resignation in 1902. From 1884 until 1912 he served as a delegate to every Republican National Convention.

At the May 1912 state convention, Henry G. Wasson, with Flinn's support, was elected chairman of the Republican state committee and Flinn was endorsed for national committeeman, but not formally elected. Their election was seen as a victory for the progressive wing of the party, which essentially took control of the party away from the more conservative Boies Penrose. Penrose, who had previously served as state committee chairman himself from 1903 through 1905, did not attend the convention, and did not seek re-elected to the post of Republican National Committeeman. Flinn, however, resigned the chairmanship after less than two months in office. A longtime supporter of Theodore Roosevelt, he expressed disappointment that the Republican Party chose not to nominate Roosevelt for President in the 1912 election, and instead nominated incumbent President William Howard Taft. He therefore followed Roosevelt out of the Republican Party, and would later become active in the state's Progressive Party. Penrose, for his part, would go on to wrest control of the State Party from Henry Wasson, one of Flinn's lieutenants who was left to lead the party following Flinn's departure.

== Business ==
Flinn's chief business interest was large-scale contracting. His firm of Booth and Flinn was formed in 1876 in association with James J. Booth. As a result of politics and a "lowest responsible bidder" scheme, Booth & Flinn won most large construction and paving contracts in Pittsburgh and Western Pennsylvania, where they built streets, trolley lines, and bridges, usually amid charges by competitors of graft. The firm built the Liberty Tunnels, Wabash Tunnel, and Armstrong Tunnels in Pittsburgh, and in the later years of the company's continuation, the Holland Tunnel between New York City and New Jersey. (Booth retired from the firm in 1898; George H. Flinn, son of the founder, succeeded him, and in 1924 two other sons, William and A. Rex Flinn joined the company).

In The Shame of the Cities, the landmark 1903 book by Lincoln Steffens on political corruption in American cities, Steffens wrote about the alleged Flinn-Magee collusion: "Magee wanted power, Flinn wealth...Magee spent his wealth for more power, and Flinn spent his power for more wealth.... Magee attracted followers, Flinn employed them. He was useful to Magee, Magee was indispensable to him....Molasses and vinegar, diplomacy and force, mind and will, they were well mated." Reformers eventually reined in Flinn by passing legislation to curb corruption and kickbacks.

Flinn was also president of the Duquesne Lumber Company and the Pittsburgh Silver Peak Gold Mining Company. He sat on the board of directors of the Arkansas Fuel Oil Company, the Arkansas Natural Gas Company, the Gulf Oil Corporation, and the Pittsburgh Coal Company.

== Personal life ==
He married Nancy Galbraith in 1874 and the couple had seven children: five boys (Howard died at the age of 2 years), two girls. His sons—William, George, Ralph, and A. Rex—became prominent in business, three of them in their father's construction firm. His daughters, Mary Flinn Lawrence and Edith, were important figures in local society. The family home, called Braemar, was in the city Highland Park district. Though raised Roman Catholic, Flinn was a member of Pittsburgh's Sixth United Presbyterian Church.

== Retirement ==
Flinn's political and business organization began to crumble in the late 1890s when a flap over the rigged bidding system came to a head with Edward Manning Bigelow, director of public works. By the 1902 elections reformers held sway and citizens voted down the machine. Magee himself had died in 1901 after a short illness.

Flinn withdrew from local politics, as a result, and retired to a country estate north of the city called Beechwood Farm. He became a gentleman farmer of Guernsey cattle, German police dogs, and Belgian hares.

During the winter months Flinn resided in Florida, where at St. Petersburg he died on February 19, 1924, at the age of 72. He is interred at Homewood Cemetery in Pittsburgh. According to the Register of Wills of Pittsburgh and Allegheny County, J.N. Mackrell, Flinn's personal property and real estate at his death exceeded $11 million.

Flinn is honored with several monuments throughout the city of Pittsburgh and the Allegheny County segment of Pennsylvania State Route 8 is named the William Flinn Highway. His country estate is now a nature reserve, Beechwood Farms Nature Reserve, operated by the Audubon Society of Western Pennsylvania. Flinn's daughter Mary used some of her inheritance to build a country estate nearby Beechwood called Hartwood; today it is open to the public as a part of Hartwood Acres Park.

Pennsylvania State Senate
Preceded by John Newmyer	Pennsylvania State Senate; 44th District; 1891–1902	Succeeded by William S. Woods
