= Laura Musser McColm Historic District =

Historic district in Iowa, United States

- U.S. National Register of Historic Places
- U.S. Historic district
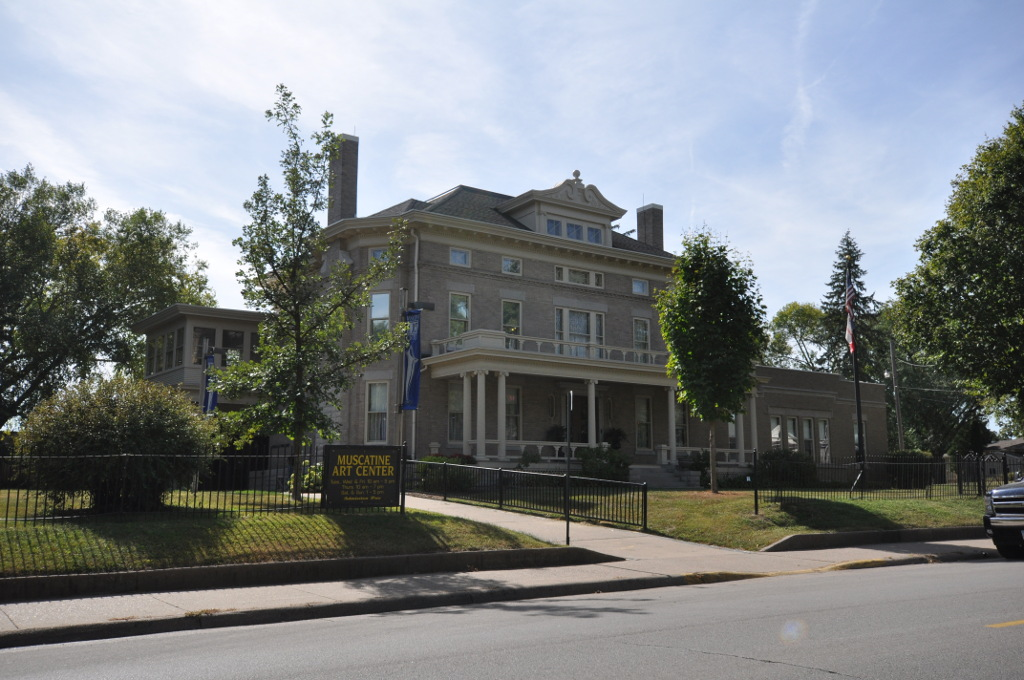

- Location within Iowa Location within the United States
- Location: 1314 Mulberry Ave. Muscatine, Iowa
- Coordinates: 41°25′56.5″N 91°03′5.2″W
- Built: 1908
- Architect: Henry W. Zeidler
- NRHP reference No.: 100000562
- Added to NRHP: January 24, 2017

The Laura Musser McColm Historic District, also known as the Muscatine Art Center, is a nationally recognized historic district located in Muscatine, Iowa, United States. It was listed on the National Register of Historic Places in 2017. Contributing properties include the 1908 residence, the carriage house from the 1920s, and the Japanese garden that was installed in 1929. The house was built for Laura Musser and her husband Edwin McColm by Laura's father Peter. It was designed by Muscatine architect Henry W. Zeidler. It contains 12 rooms that flank large corridors on both floors. After Edwin's death in 1933 Laura married William T. Atkins in 1938 and resided at his home in Kansas City, Missouri. She retained ownership of this house, and visited frequently, until her death in 1964. The following year her heirs donated the estate to the art museum along with a $100,000 endowment to maintain the house. A $1.5 million renovation of the facility was completed in 2017.

In 2021, a grant from the Iowa Department of Cultural affairs to restore the historic Japanese-style garden was announced.

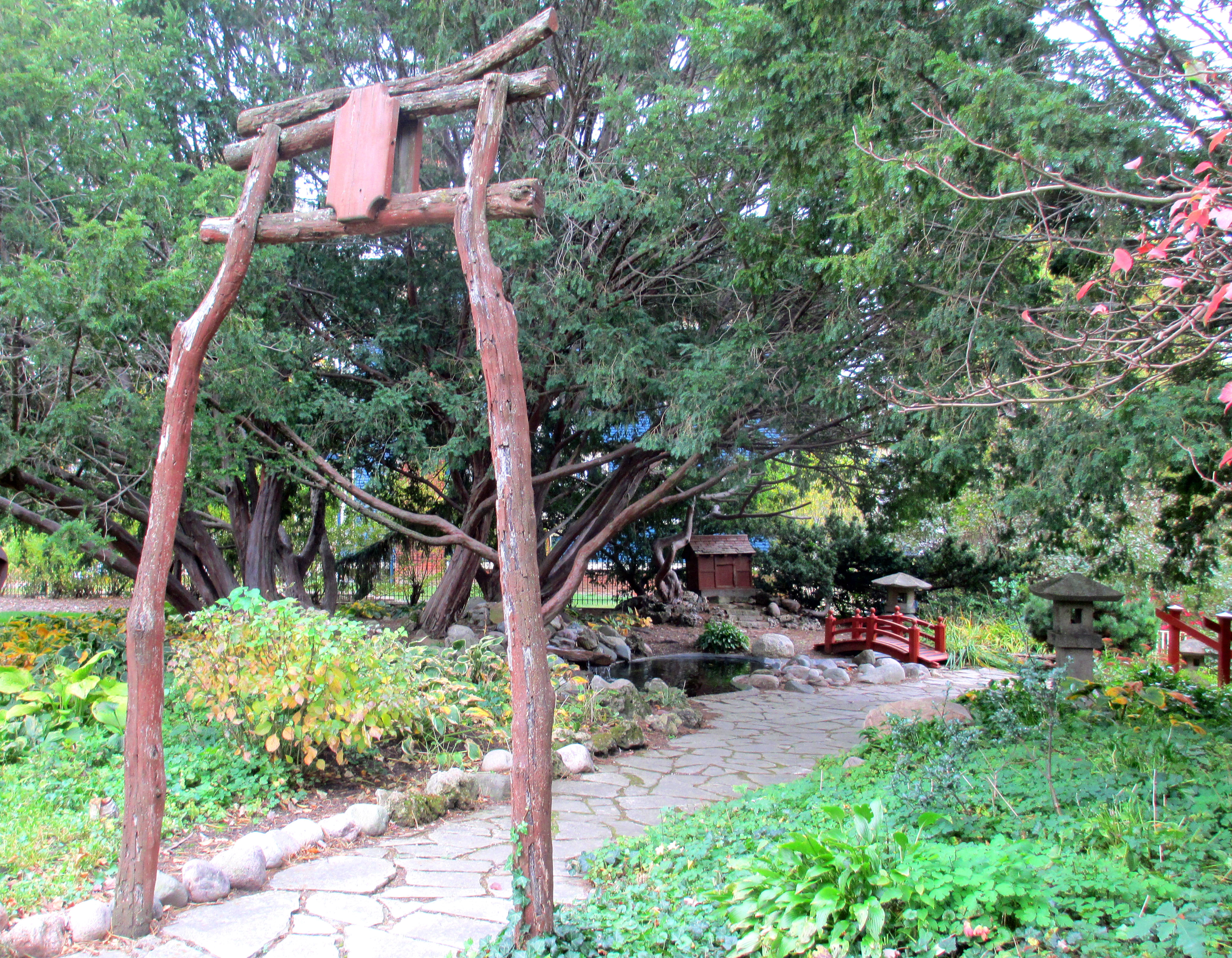
Muscatine Art Center Japanese-style garden, built c.1930

== Photographs ==
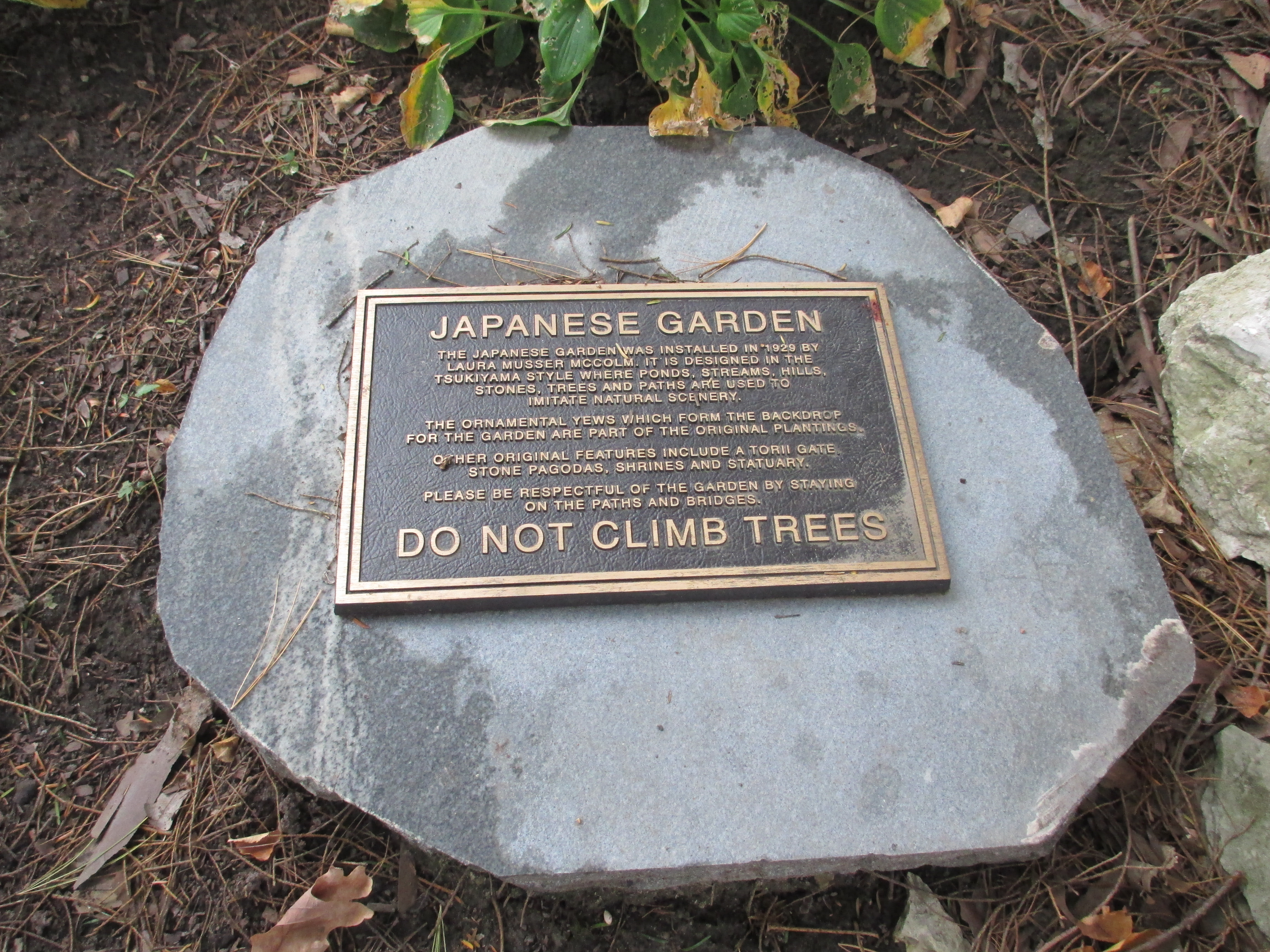

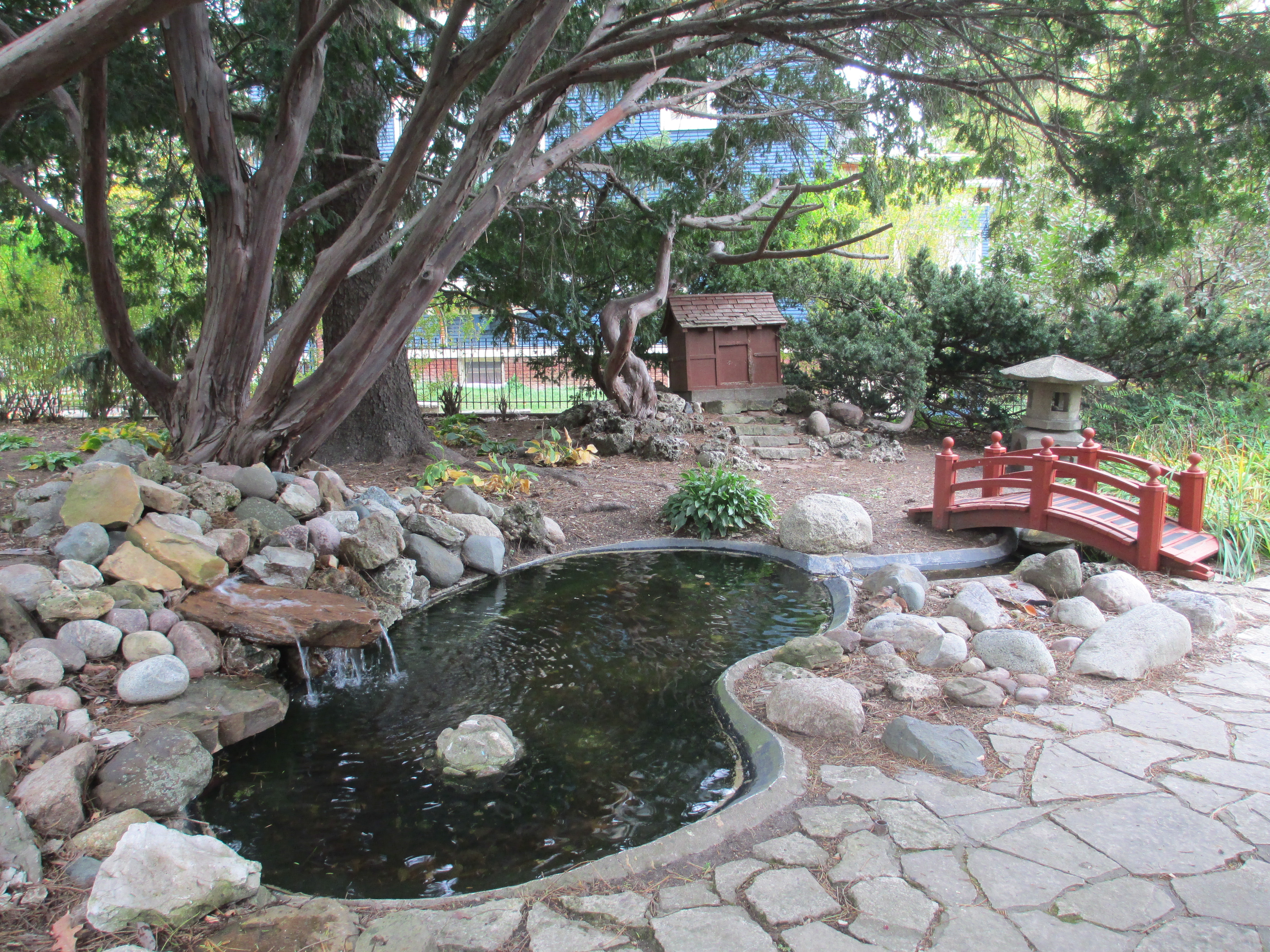

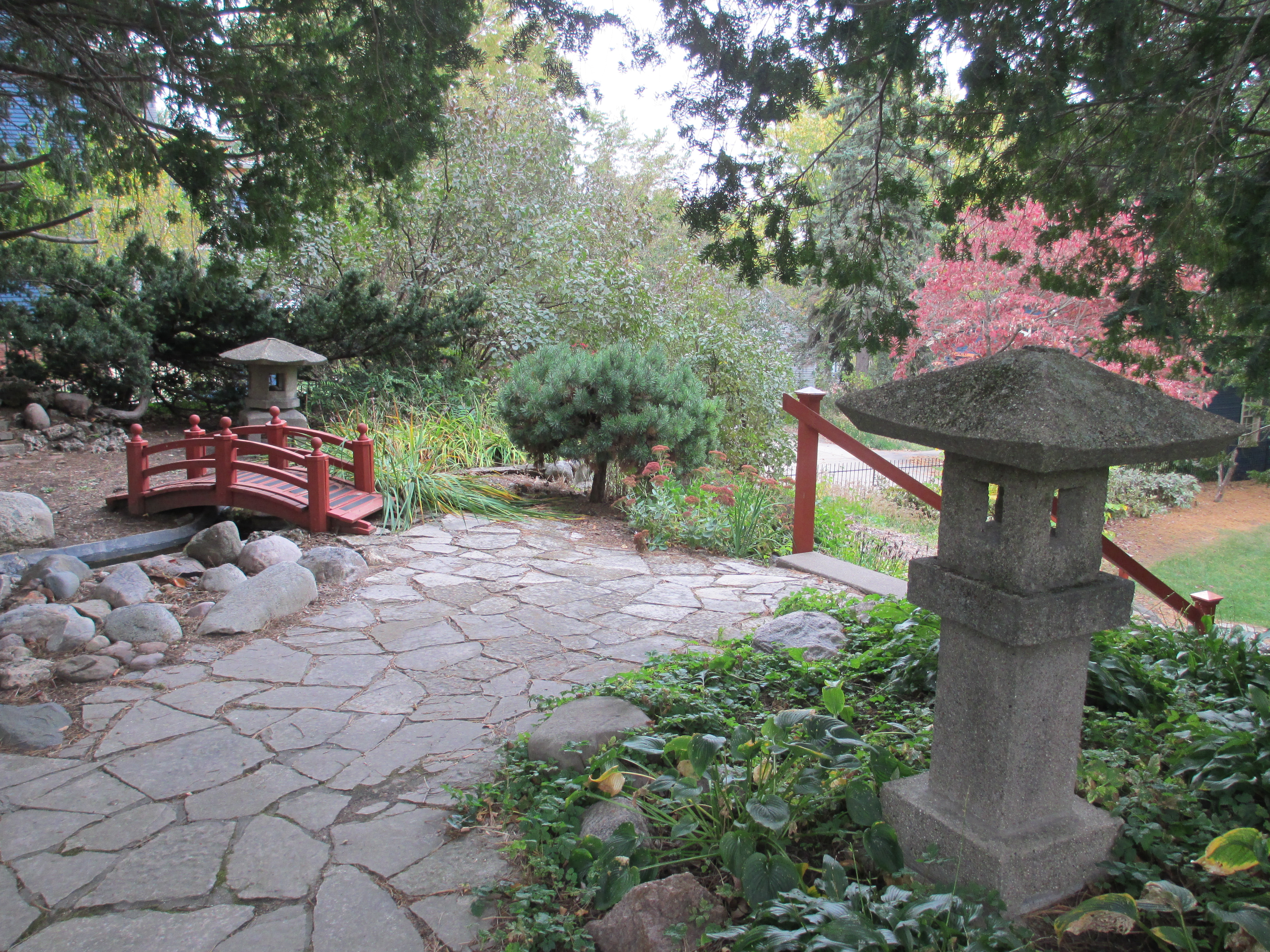

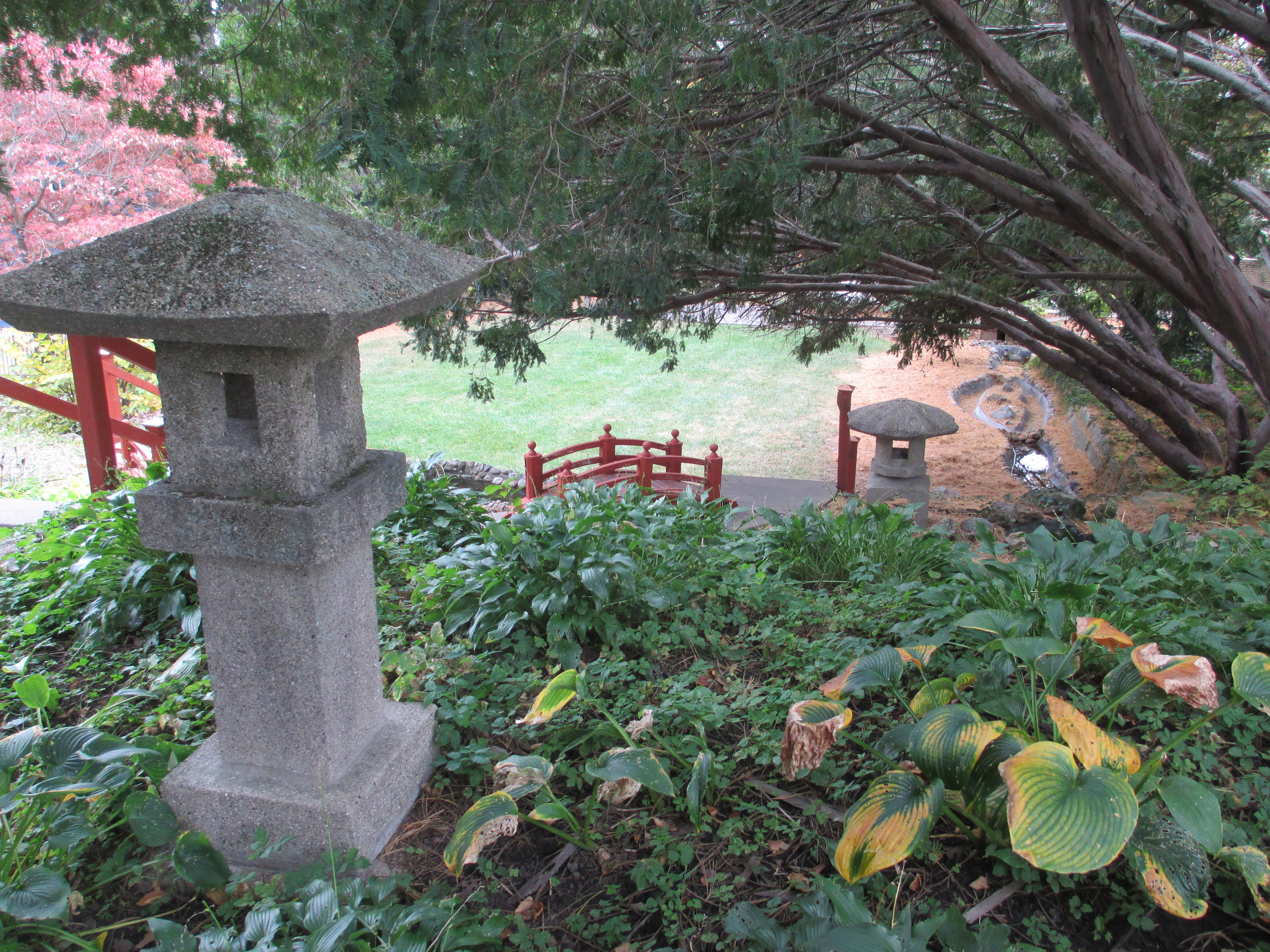

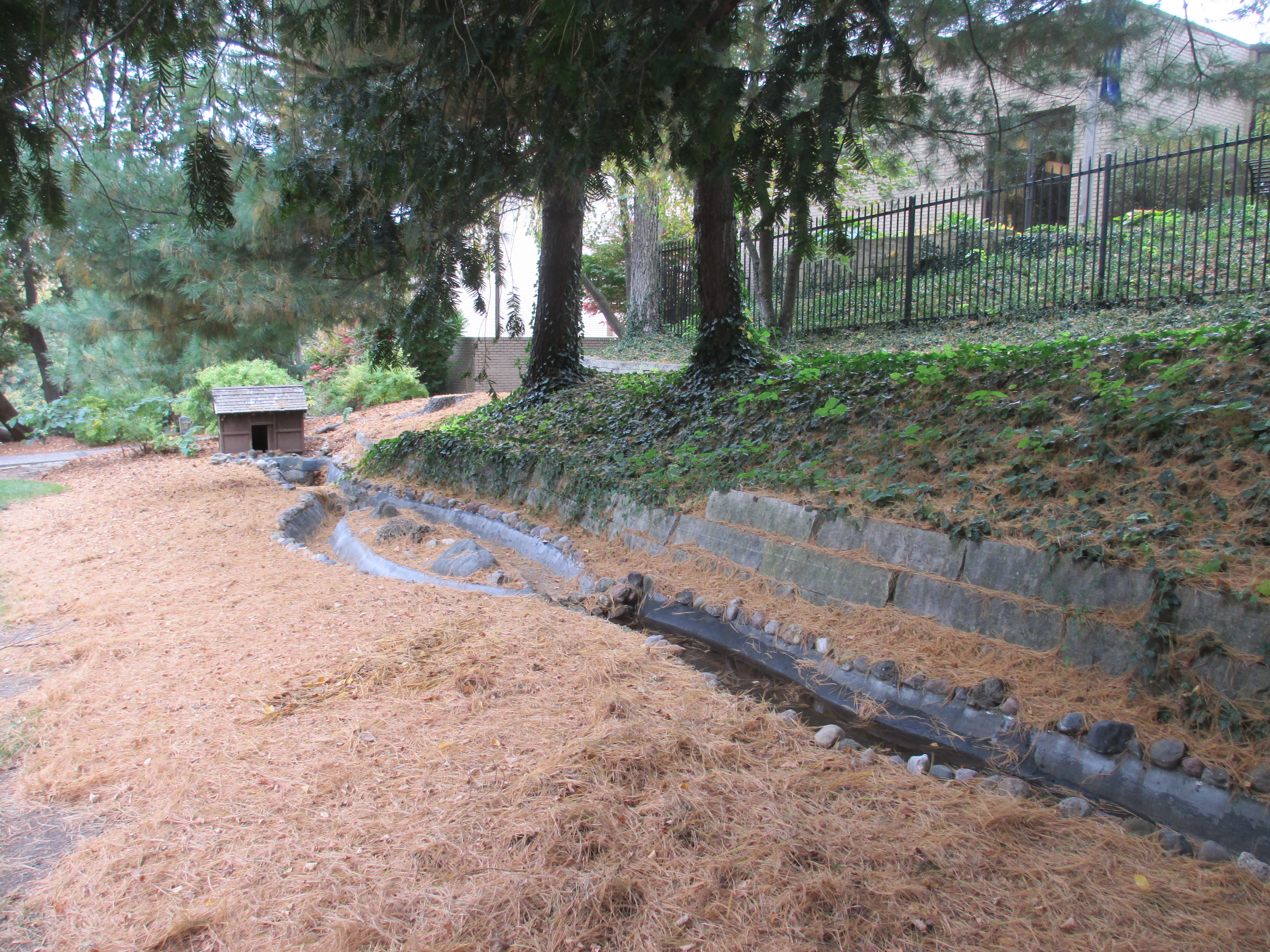

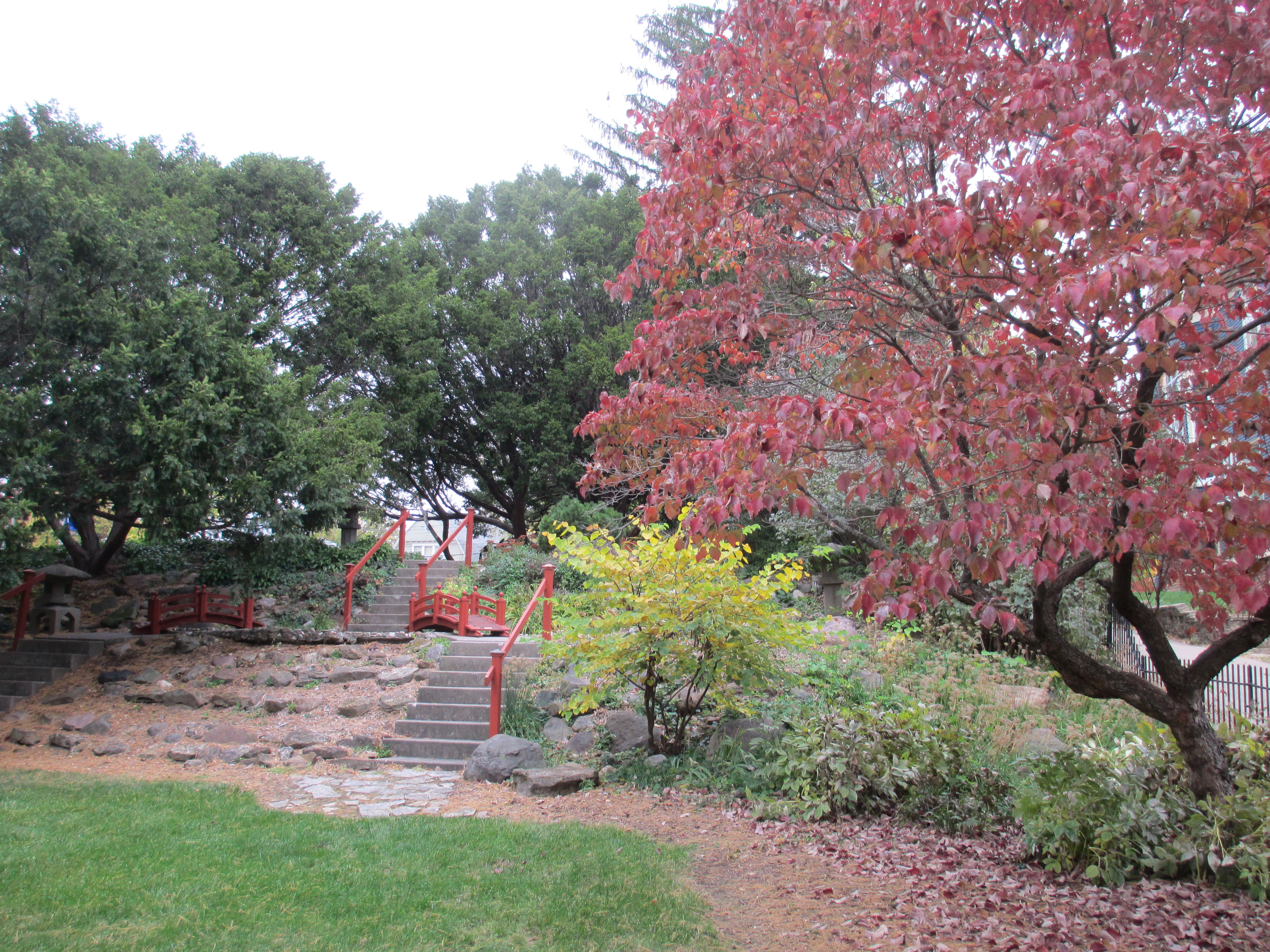

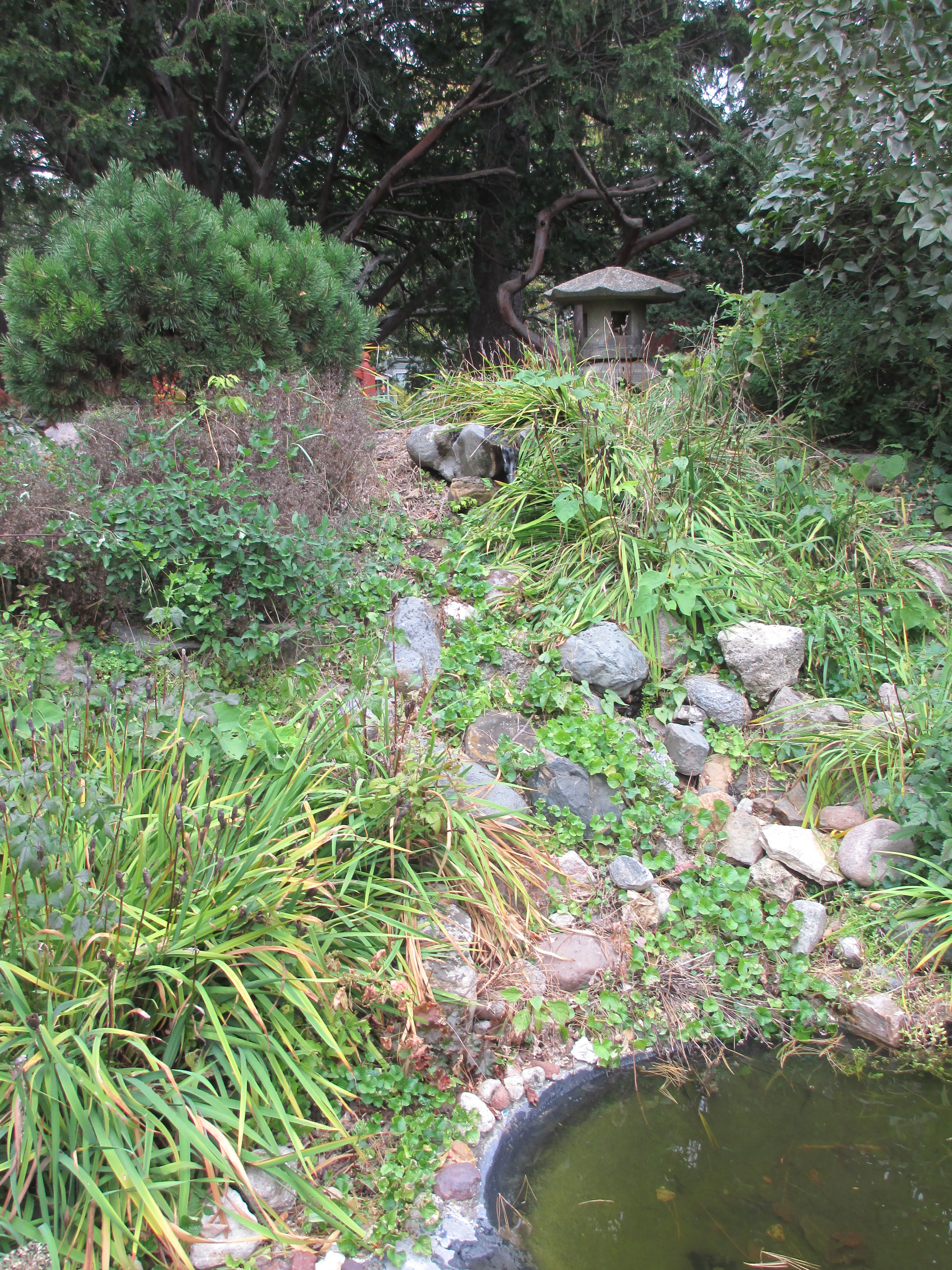
