= Burt Reynolds and Friends Museum =

Coordinates: 26.93439°N 80.08168°W

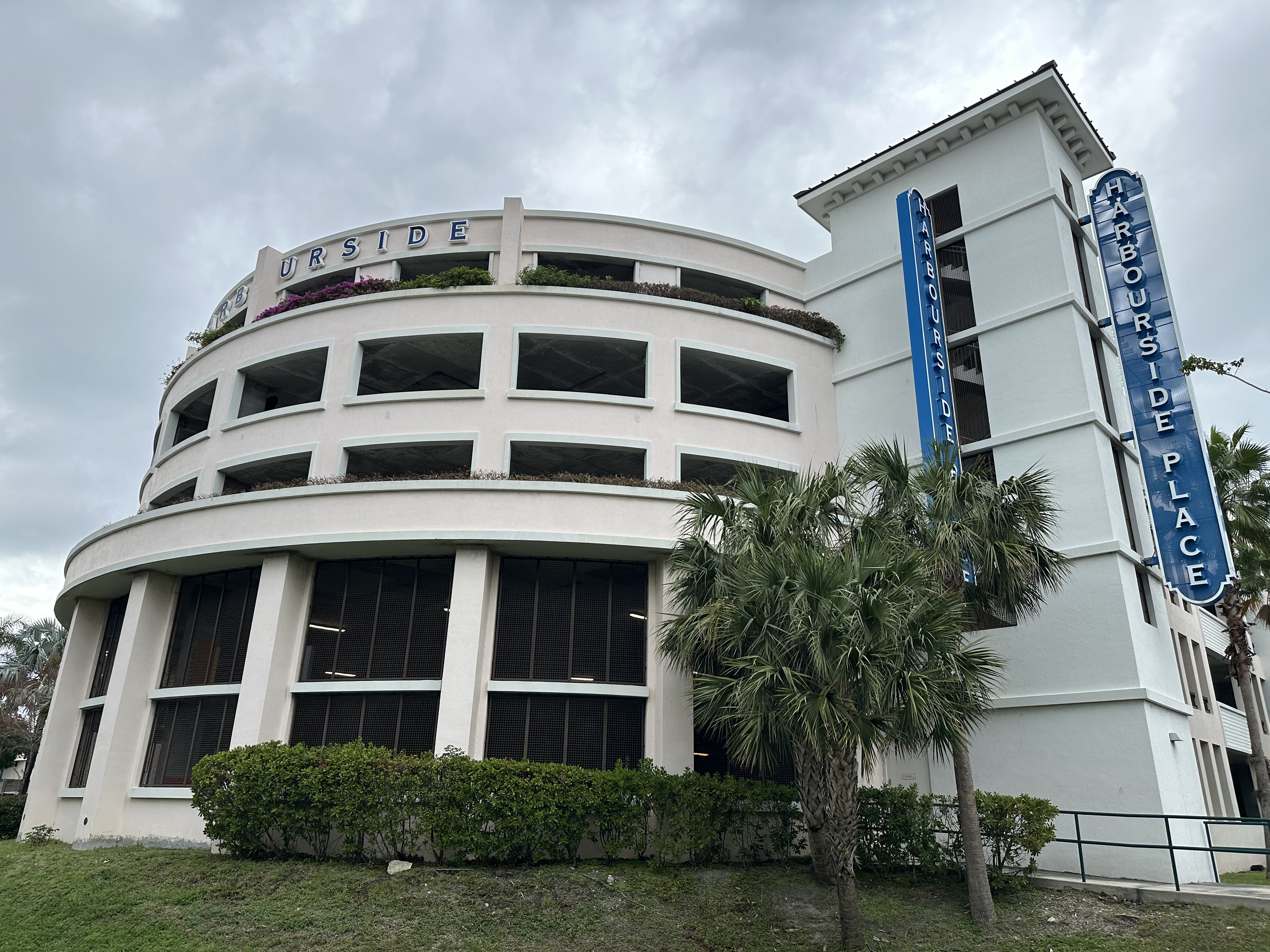
Former Location of the Burt Reynolds and Friends Museum, now a parking garage.

The Burt Reynolds and Friends Museum, which also housed the Burt Reynolds Institute for Film and Theatre (BRIFT), was located in Jupiter, Florida, the hometown of the actor Burt Reynolds (1936-2018). The museum displayed memorabilia from Reynolds' movies, and was billed as "Florida’s largest celebrity museum". It also offered filmmaking and acting classes, some taught by Reynolds himself.

The museum opened in 2004, when Reynolds transferred memorabilia from his nearby home. In 2012 the museum was vacated. After it closed, there were proposals to build a new museum at nearby Burt Reynolds Park. But funds could not be raised, and Reynolds sold parts of the collection.
