= Wiregrass Museum of Art =

Museum in Dothan, Alabama, USA

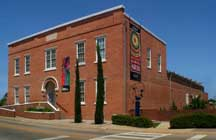
- The museum in April 2007
- Established: 1988
- Location: 126 N. College St., Dothan, Alabama, U.S.
- Coordinates: 31°13′28″N 85°23′20″W
- Type: Art
- Director: Dana-Marie Lemmer
- Website: www.wiregrassmuseum.org
- Dothan Municipal Light and Water Plant
- U.S. National Register of Historic Places
- Alabama Register of Landmarks and Heritage
- Area: 3 acres (1.2 ha)
- Built: 1913
- Architect: W. F. Thornton
- NRHP reference No.: 90001315

Significant dates
- Added to NRHP: October 3, 1991
- Designated ARLH: March 23, 1990

The Wiregrass Museum of Art (formerly the Dothan Municipal Light and Water Plant) is an art museum in Dothan, Alabama, United States. The museum was founded in 1988 and is located in the city's former power and water plant. The building was listed on the Alabama Register of Landmarks and Heritage in 1990 and the National Register of Historic Places in 1991.

== Museum ==
The museum was founded in 1988, in response to a magazine article that named Dothan as one of the worst places in the United States to live. It hosts traveling exhibits, as well as its permanent collection of American contemporary and pop art, including works by Josef Albers, Jim Dine, Robert Indiana, and Frank Stella.

== Building ==
=== History ===
Dothan was settled in the 1830s and incorporated in 1885, but did not see much growth until the coming of the railroads in the 1890s. As the town grew quickly in the 1910s, a new power plant was needed, as the former one was no longer adequate. The new plant was built in 1912–13 and consisted of a powerhouse, garage and tool shed, cooling pond, coal yard, two pump houses, machine storage building, small tool shed, covered reservoir, substation, auxiliary reservoir, underground gasoline tank, two scales, a well, and two small office buildings. At the time, it was the only coal-fired power plant in the Wiregrass Region. The station contained two 3,000-Kw generators and a large water pump with a 1 million-gallon storage tank. The city used the plant as a promotional tool to attract new industry to the region, advertising cheap energy rates.

By 1928, the plant had become expensive to operate and was shut down, with the city receiving electricity from Alabama Power's hydroelectric facilities. The city made improvements to the power plant and took over supply in 1933. Alabama Power began supplying some electricity to the city once more in 1942, and by 1949 had completely taken over supply. The generators and water pumps were removed, and the building was used as offices and storage by the city. The Wiregrass Museum of Art moved into the building in the early 1990s.

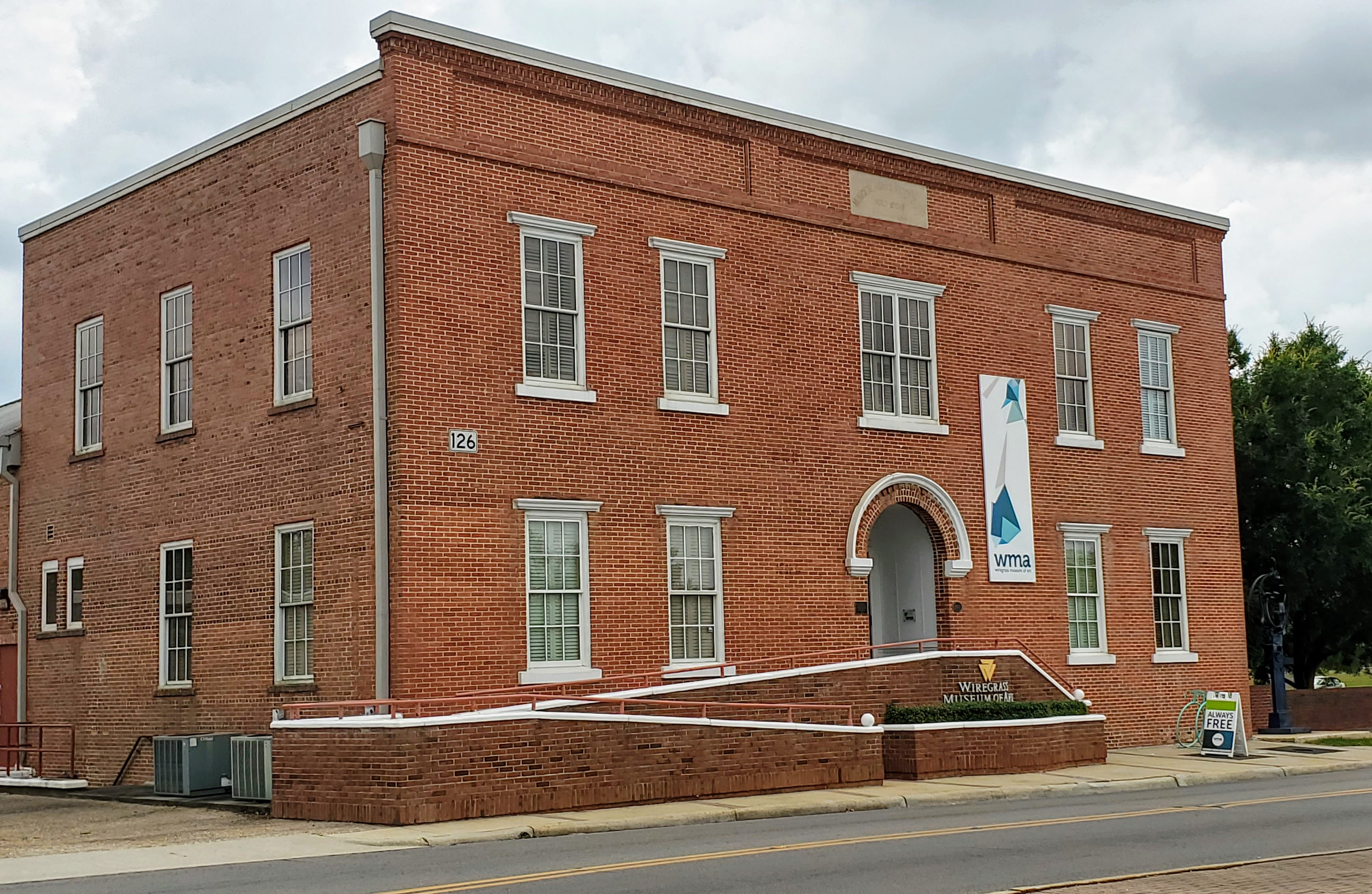
Wiregras Museum of Art - June 2021

=== Architecture ===
Of the original complex, only the powerhouse remains standing today. The powerhouse is divided into three sections: the two-story, flat-roofed front section was used as offices; the hip roofed middle section originally housed the generators; and the rear section, separated from the middle by a stepped brick firewall, was used for coal storage. The façade of the building is five bays wide, with a recessed entrance. The entrance is topped with a fanlight and decorative brick and granite arch. Windows on the façade were originally six-over-six sashes, but have since been replaced with single fixed panes. The building has a corbelled and denticulated parapet with a granite tablet inscribed with "Municipal Light & Water Plant - Built 1912–13".
