= Buckeye Building =

- Buckeye State Building and Loan Company Building
- U.S. National Register of Historic Places
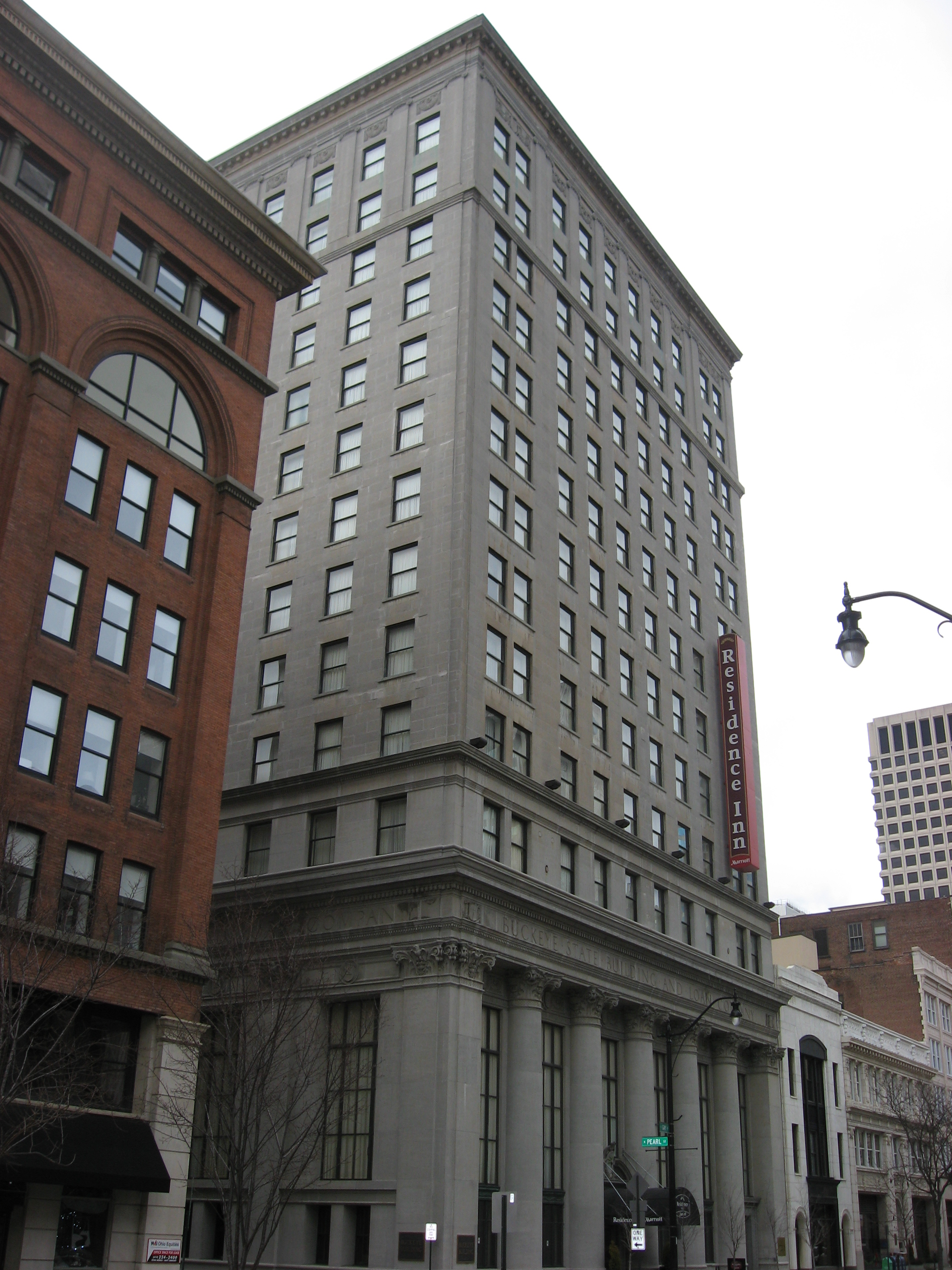
- Interactive map highlighting the building's location
- Location: 36-42 E. Gay St., Columbus, Ohio
- Coordinates: 39.964115°N 82.999770°W
- Built: 1927
- Architect: Hopkins & Dentz
- Architectural style: Neoclassical
- NRHP reference No.: 04001145
- Added to NRHP: October 13, 2004

The Buckeye Building, also known as the Buckeye State Building and Loan Company Building, is a historic building in Downtown Columbus, Ohio. The 16-story building was built from 1926 to 1927. It was the headquarters for the Buckeye State Building and Loan Company, and after 1949 for the Buckeye Federal Savings and Loan Association. It was listed on the National Register of Historic Places in 2004. The building was converted into a hotel, opening as a Marriott Residence Inn in 2008.

== See also ==
- National Register of Historic Places listings in Columbus, Ohio
