= Lydall =

Lydall is a surname. Notable people with the name include:

- Edward Lydall, English stage actor of the seventeenth century
- Julia Lydall (born 1986), British sport shooter
