= Legacy List With Matt Paxton =

American television show

Legacy List With Matt Paxton is an American television show. Each episode of the show features a home full of family heirlooms that must be cataloged and organized. The show is hosted by Matt Paxton, a downsizing and cleaning expert who was formerly a featured cleaner on the show Hoarders. The program airs on PBS.

The show was nominated for a 2021 Daytime Emmy Award for Outstanding Lifestyle Series.
